= Veronique Chevalier =

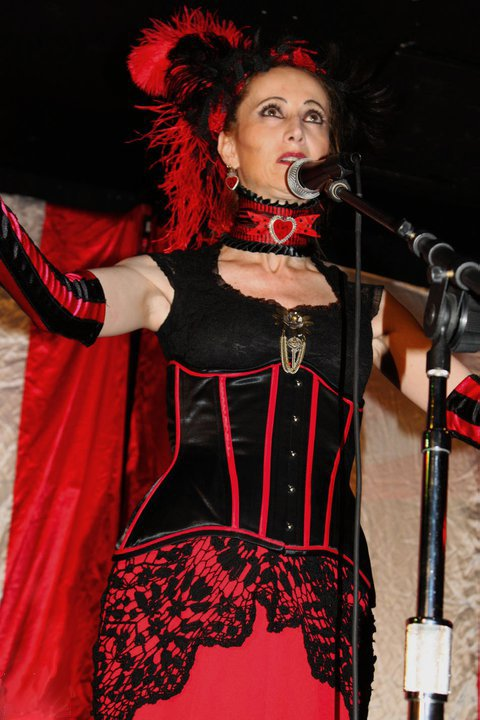
- Veronique Chevalier, July 24, 2010, Club Chrononaut, San Diego, CA

Background information
- Also known as: MADemoiselle Veronique, the "Weird Val" of Dark Cabaret, Mad V, Cyphyre
- Born: Berenice Chloe Sztuczka
- Origin: Fontainebleau, France
- Genres: Dark cabaret; parody; comedy; polka; burlesque
- Instrument: Vocals
- Years active: 2005–present
- Labels: Cyphyre Music LLC, Gilded Age Records, Projekt Records

Veronique Chevalier (born Berenice Chloe Sztuczka) is a French-born American mistress of ceremonies, singer-songwriter, music producer, comedian and parodist popular in the steampunk community. She produces live cabaret in Southern California and is an emcee of steampunk events nationwide.

== Life and career ==
Chevalier attended Oregon State University in Corvallis, graduating with a Bachelor of Science in Liberal Studies, and is a trained classical ballet dancer.

Since 2005, Chevalier has been producing and hosting "Veronique's Red Velvet Variety Show", a live vaudeville and cabaret production featuring local as well as "big name" musical performers, unusual acts, magic, burlesque and comedy. Former performers in Chevalier's shows include Unextraordinary Gentlemen and Unwoman. Recent shows have also been cosponsored by Gilded Age Records and SepiaChord.com.

Chevalier has a credited cameo role in the 2005 short film mocumentary, Camp Burlesque, and also appears in the companion book Postcards from Camp Burlesque.

Chevalier is also a singer and songwriter. In 2005 she produced an "info-tainment" benefit project—a theatrical show and recording—called Cabaret4Choice. The recording garnered Chevalier the Unanimous Choice Award for Best Independent Cabaret Artist at the 14th Annual Los Angeles Music Awards.

In 2008 she produced the album, "Polka Haunt Us", featuring guest artists including Lili Haydn, Kerry Christensen, Marion Ramsey, and Vinny Golia. The album was a critical success, and was an official entry on the 51st Annual Grammy ballot in the Polka category (the final year prior to a decision by The National Academy of Recording Arts and Sciences to discontinue the category). Her song, "Beer Hall in Hell" has been played on the Dr. Demento radio show, and her song, "Vampire Surprise" won The Mad Music Archive's 2007 "Best New Halloween Song". Chevalier is also one of twenty artists featured on "A Sepiachord Passport", a compilation recording released by Projekt Records. Her track, a tango entitled, "The Dance Master", has received favorable reviews.

In May 2010, Chevalier performed at The Steampunk World's Fair in Piscataway, New Jersey. In July 2010 she was emcee of the Saturday steampunk "after-party" at San Diego Comic-Con, where the headliners included The Slow Poisoner, Unextraordinary Gentlemen and Voltaire.

In March 2011, Chevalier was the MC and opened for Unextraordinary Gentlemen and Abney Park at Wild Wild West Con, a steampunk convention and festival held at Old Tucson Studios in Tucson, Arizona. In October 2011, she was asked to MC Amanda Palmer's solo show (kicking off a West Coast tour) in San Diego, and in November, she performed the Welcome Song at the opening ceremonies at the steampunk convention TeslaCon] in Madison, Wisconsin.

In September 2012 Veronique was a Featured Guest at Stan Lee's Comikaze Expo and hosted a panel entitled, "Steampunk 'Super'-Culture: Symbiosis Between Various Sub-Cultures & Fandoms". Panelists included steampunk master magician Pop Haydn, Disney artist Brian Kesinger, and members of The League of STEAM. She has since repeated the panel at other conventions, including Comic-Con and TeslaCon.

In December 2012, TeslaCon named its music performance hall the "Chevalier Music Hall" in her honor. Veronique is also a featured portrait in Brian Kesinger's steampunk fantasy series, "Tea Girls."

=== Stage persona ===
Like many in the steampunk community, Chevalier has assumed a "stage persona" and created a backstory for it:

Mademoiselle Veronique Marie Therese Antoinette de Chevalier ... is reputed to be the long-lost "illegitimate" grand daughter of Maurice Chevalier, as well as the former Etoile (Prima Ballerina Assoluta) for Les Ballets de la Salle de Bain de Paris. Her career was cut short while the company was on the Tehachapi leg of their most recent US tour, when she took a tumble into the orchestra pit during her solo, due to a sudden blackout, caused by a drunken cowboy shooting out the headlights of the pickup truck that served as the stage lighting.
After she came to, some weeks later, she had lost all memory of ever having danced, as well as having also forgotten her native French tongue. She can now only speak in—what is considered by all who hear it—her own charming version of accented English.

== Discography ==
Albums

- Cabaret4Choice (2005) (executive producer)
- Polka Haunt Us (2008)

Singles

- "Vampire Surprise" (2007)
- "Beer Hall in Hell" (2009)
- "Escargots" (parody of "La Vie en rose") (2009)
- "Internet Date" (2010)

== See also ==
- List of steampunk works: Steampunk musicians
- List of dark cabaret artists
