= Unextraordinary Gentlemen =

American post-punk band

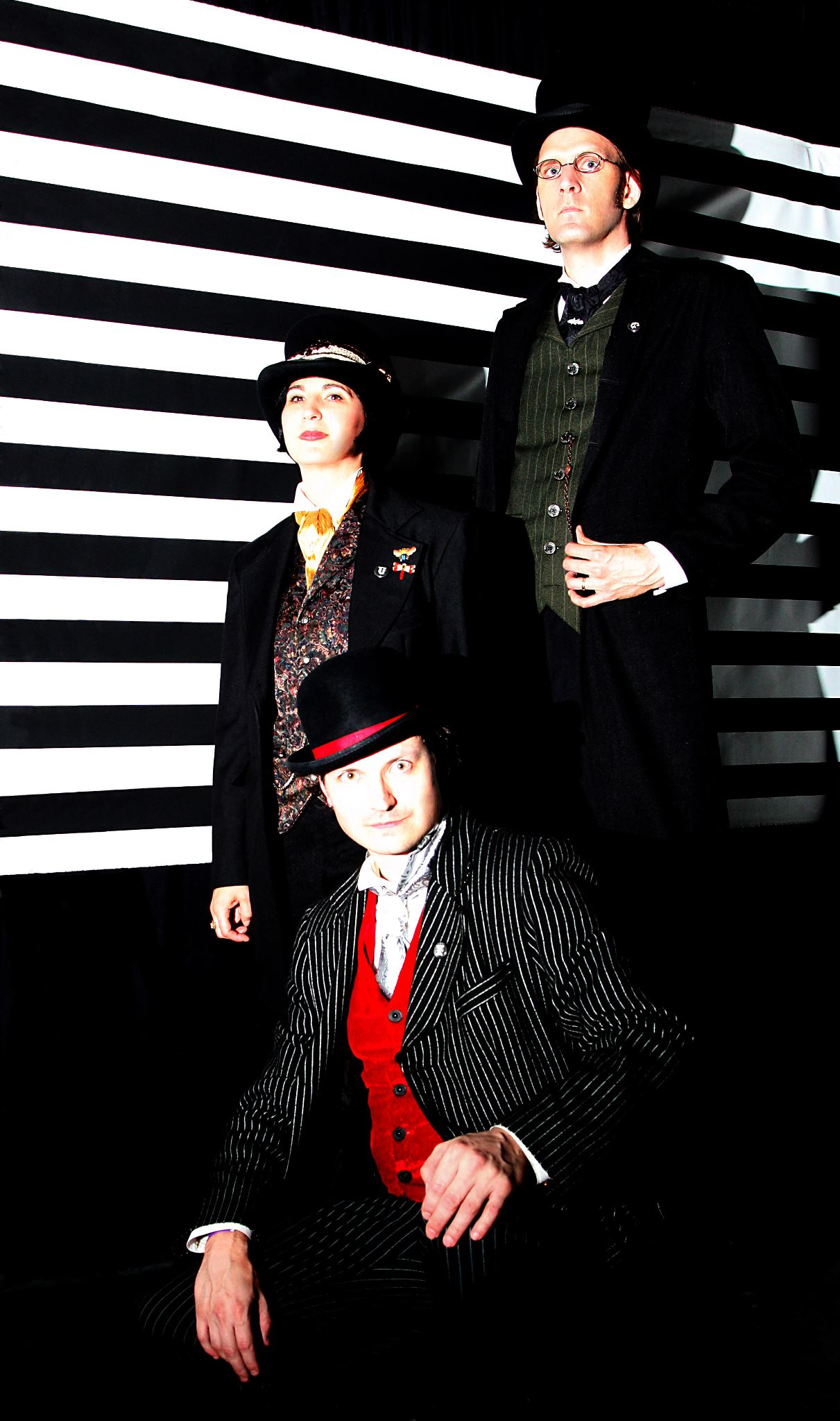
- From top to bottom: Richard "Professor Mangrove" Pilawski, Jennifer "J. Frances" Pomerantz, Eric "Malcom" Schreeck

Background information
- Origin: Los Angeles, California, United States
- Genres: Post-punk
- Years active: 2007-current
- Members: Eric "Malcom" Schreeck; Richard "Professor Mangrove" Pilawski; Jennifer "J. Frances" Pomerantz

Unextraordinary Gentlemen (UXG) is an American post-punk band formed in Los Angeles in 2005 by bassist/keyboardist Richard Pilawski (previously with the surf punk band Sex with Lurch) & vocalist/lyricist Eric Schreeck to "...explore our love for post-punk, synth-pop, industrial & experimental music combined with the literary genre of Victorian fantasy." The project went public in early 2007, joined by Jennifer Pomerantz (of Demonika & The Darklings) on violin. The band's name is a tongue-in-cheek nod to Alan Moore's The League of Extraordinary Gentlemen.

UXG has been called one of the "foremost of the musical assets of... steampunk" and has been interviewed by or featured in several genre and local scene publications. Their first CD, 5 Tales from God-Only-Knows received positive reviews from several sources, most notably ReGen magazine, Mick Mercer and Sepiachord. Mick Mercer called their second release, No Hands To Guide Us, "most impressive". In December 2011, the 2010 version of their song, "Open Arms, Empty Air" was a Track of the Week on the UK review site, "Keep Pop Loud".

== Back-story ==
The band has created a back-story set in a fictional area based on a mixture of Victorian England and American Old West, with the band members taking on alternate identities that relate to that back-story. In character, the band members are time travellers who have come from that past using one of Professor Mangrove's amazing inventions. Most of their songs are set in and tell stories about this fictional 19th century place, sung from the points-of-view of characters like "Clive the Barker", "Dread Penny" and "Elwood Lovekraken". A page on their website contains "The Unextraordinary Encyclopedia", a list of names, places and events in this fictional world that are referred to in their music.

== Career ==
UXG has performed in notable venues such as the CIA, the Knitting Factory and the Derby, and have performed at major goth and steampunk events including Eccentrik Festival, Bats Day and The Edwardian Ball. They can often be heard on a number of steampunk radio broadcasts that stream worldwide, such as The Clockwork Cabaret, and were recently featured in the SmallWORLD podcast's focus on steampunk.

Festival appearances have included:

- The 2008 Edwardian Ball in San Francisco, CA.
- The 5th Annual Eccentrik Festival in Chapel Hill, NC 2008.
- Bats Day in the Fun Park Dark Park Festival 2008 in Anaheim, CA.
- Gothla: The Divining: Cogs In Motion in Pomona, CA 2009.
- San Diego Comic-Con's steampunk after-party "The Ventricular Engine", in San Diego, CA, July 2009.
- The Steampunk World's Fair in Piscataway, NJ, May 2010.
- San Diego Comic-Con's steampunk after-party "The League of Temporal Adventurers First Society Gala", in San Diego, CA, July 2010, headlining with Voltaire and The Slow Poisoner.
- Wild Wild West Con at Old Tucson Studios in Tucson, Arizona, March 2011.
- San Diego Comic-Con's steampunk after-party "The Time Machine", in San Diego, CA, July 2011, headlining with Abney Park.
- Steamstock 2013 in San Francisco, California.

=== Collaboration ===
- Their song "Open Arms, Empty Air" was remixed by Vernian Process.
- Their song "Mr. Soot's Little Black Book" was also included on the steampunk compilation, An Age Remembered: A Steampunk and Neo-Victorian Mix (2007)
- Malcom Schreeck helped write the lyrics on two songs by Vernian Process ("The Alchemist's Vision", and "Crime of the Century") and is credited with vocals on versions of those tracks.
- In 2011, their song "Open Arms, Empty Air" was again remixed, this time by Barry Adamson, as well as their song, "Goodbye 1870s", a reworking of Yazoo's "Goodbye Seventies".
- Adamson also remixed their song, "Black Iron Road", for the "Projekt Presents: A Dark Cabaret 2" (September 2011 release date).

== Discography ==
=== Albums ===
- Stars Pulled Down (August 7, 2012)

=== EPs ===
- 5 Tales From God-Only-Knows (Dec. 2007)
- No Hands To Guide Us (Oct. 2008)

=== Singles ===
Open Arms, Empty Air (2-songs, digital only - Mar. 2011)

== See also ==
- List of steampunk works: Steampunk musicians
