= Placebo effect (disambiguation) =

A placebo effect is a phenomenon of medication or medical treatment, even inert or ineffective ones, to exhibit results simply because the recipient believes that it will work.

Placebo effect may also refer to:

- Placebo Effect (band), a German dark electro band
- Placebo Effect (film), a 1998 American thriller film
- "Placebo Effect" (song), a 2023 song by D4vd
- Placebo Effect (novel), a 1998 novel by Gary Russell
- "The Placebo Effect", an episode of the television series The Twilight Zone
- "Placebo Effect", a song by Siouxsie and the Banshees from the 1979 album Join Hands

== See also ==
- Placebo (disambiguation)
- Nocebo effect, the phenomenon of a patient's expectations for a treatment causing the treatment to have a worse effect than it otherwise would have
