= Eccentrik =

Music festival in Raleigh, North Carolina

Eccentrik Festival
- Genre: Electronic music, goth, deathrock, psychobilly, gothic rock, industrial, post-punk, dark cabaret, steampunk, synthpop
- Dates: 3-days in October
- Location: Raleigh, North Carolina
- Years active: 2004–2009

The Eccentrik Festival was an annual 3-day Goth and industrial music festival held in the Raleigh, North Carolina area and had in some years been spread out between several different venues. The festival started in October 2004. Musical styles typically featured at Eccentrik included deathrock, psychobilly, gothic rock, industrial, post-punk, dark cabaret, steampunk, synthpop and other related genres. The festival was also notable for its party-like atmosphere, the pre-festival meet n' greet, art show, and a dancefloor featuring goth, deathrock, industrial, steampunk and post-punk djs from around the US.

In 2008, the Eccentrik Festival went steampunk by asking some of the most well-known musicians in that genre to perform, as well as having the Davenport sisters of the weekly radio program, The Clockwork Cabaret, act as hosts for the event.

== Band lineups by year ==
2004
Clockwerk (the band) | Ego Likeness | More Machine Than Man | Oddstar | Razed in Black | RJE | Red All Over | Threshold 6

2005
Bella Morte | The Brides | In Tenebris | The Last Dance | Voltaire

2006
Americlone | Anders Manga | Attrition | Ego Likeness | High Blue Star

2007
Meg Lee Chin | The Last Dance | Cylab | The Gothsicles | The Hellblinki Sextet | Terrorcouple

2008
The Brides | The Ghosts Project | The Hellblinki Sextet | Nicki Jaine | Nathaniel Johnstone | Jill Tracy | Unextraordinary Gentlemen | Vernian Process

2009
The Clockwork Dolls | The Extraordinary Contraptions | Lemming Malloy | The Two Man Gentlemen Band | Unwoman | Veronique Diabolique | Vernian Process

== See also ==
- List of industrial music festivals
- List of gothic festivals
- List of electronic music festivals
- Live electronic music
