= Martín Irigoyen =

Argentine musician (born 1977)

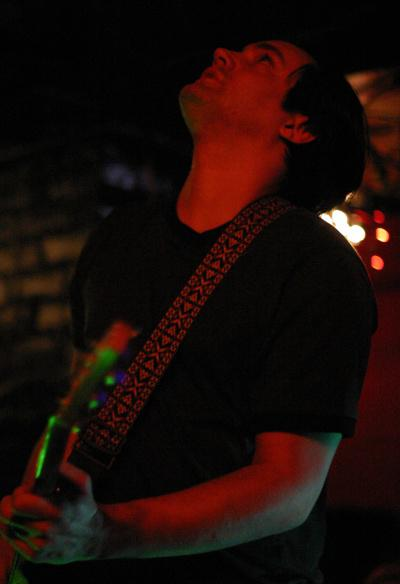
- With Sodium Channel in Berkeley, CA.

Background information
- Born: Martín Daniel Irigoyen; January 14, 1977 (age 49); Buenos Aires, Argentina.
- Genres: Steampunk, dark wave, neo-classical, post-punk, alternative rock, experimental, trip hop
- Occupations: Composer, Multi-instrumentalist, Songwriter, Sound Designer, Record producer
- Instruments: Guitar, Prepared guitar, Oud, Setar, Bağlama Saz, Bouzouki, Barbat, Tanbur, Charango, Sitar, Bass, Theremin, Drums, Piano, Percussion, Electronics, Dramyen, Dan-Bau, Various world instruments
- Years active: 1991 - Present
- Label: Gilded Age Records

Martín Daniel Irigoyen (born January 14, 1977) is an Argentine musician best known as a composer and multi-instrumentalist with Vernian Process and Profondo Delle Tenebre. He has participated in many solo and group projects outside of Vernian Process, as well as being an active producer.

== Career ==
Irigoyen was born in Buenos Aires, Argentina, where he participated in numerous musical projects in various styles. In 2008 he joined Steampunk pioneers Vernian Process as a full-time member. Vernian Process has shared the stage with artists such as Thomas Dolby, Attrition, Skinny Puppy, Voltaire (musician), Jill Tracy, Abney Park and others.

Irigoyen uses various effects and utensils to create original guitar soundscapes. He also uses alternate tunings and plays several different styles. Being a prepared guitar player, he uses for his performances items such as screwdrivers, tweezers, hangers, drumsticks, and more.
