= List of industrial music festivals =

List of industrial festivals
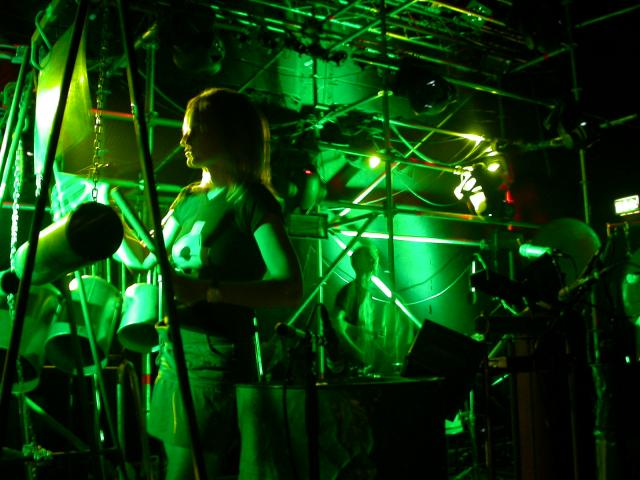

General Information
- Related genres: Industrial music, electro-industrial, EBM, industrial rock, industrial metal
- Location: Worldwide
- Related events: Concert tour, music festival, heavy metal festivals, EDM festivals, goth festivals, rock festivals, punk festivals
- Related topics: Cassette culture, rivethead, steampunk, industrial music bands

The following is a list of industrial music festivals, which encapsulates music festivals focused on industrial music. The list may have some overlap with list of electronic music festivals, list of gothic festivals, and list of heavy metal festivals. Industrial music is a genre of experimental music that draws on transgressive and provocative themes. The term was coined in the mid-1970s, and precursors included acts such as electronic group Kraftwerk, experimental rock acts such as The Velvet Underground and Frank Zappa, psychedelic rock artists such as Jimi Hendrix, and composers such as John Cage. AllMusic defines industrial as the "most abrasive and aggressive fusion of rock and electronic music"; "initially a blend of avant-garde electronics experiments (tape music, musique concrète, white noise, synthesizers, sequencers, etc.) and punk provocation".

Notable hybrid genres are industrial rock from the late 1970s and industrial metal from the 1980s, while electro-industrial developed in the late 1980s. Because of its genre fluidity, industrial music may be featured at rock festivals, heavy metal festivals, goth festivals, and electronic music festivals, though there are also festivals dedicated solely to industrial music. In North America in particular, electro-industrial music is often termed industrial dance, and since the late 1980s industrial music festivals often attract industrial fans termed rivetheads or cybergoths, with other countercultures such as cyberpunk and goth appearing as well. Cybergoth dance styles include rave dance styles, while more rock-focused festivals may feature dance styles such as pogoing, headbanging, and moshing. The rivethead dress code that emerged in the late 1980s is militaristic with hints of punk aesthetics and fetish fashion, while cybergoth fashion from the late 1990s combines rivethead industrial aesthetics with a style associated with "gravers" (gothic ravers).

== Festivals ==
Festival name	Years	Location	Genre and details
Berlin Atonal	1982–1990 2013–present	Germany	Originally held at SO36 in Kreuzberg, the early years of Atonal fostered revolutionary and innovative musical acts such as Psychic TV, Einstürzende Neubauten, Test Dept, 808 State, Die Haut among many others.
Whitby Goth Weekend	1994–present	Whitby, North Yorkshire, UK	Twice-yearly goth festival with genres such as EBM and industrial
Infest	1998–present	Bradford, England	Mixture of electronic, industrial and gothic music
Bats Day in the Fun Park	1999–present	Anaheim, California, U.S.	Created by two local goth/industrial and deathrock clubs
Maschinenfest	1999–2018	Oberhausen, Germany	Industrial, power electronics, and other alternative electronic performers
Tinnitus	1999–2009	Stockholm, Sweden	subgenres of alternative electronic music such as Industrial, EBM, Synthpop and Futurepop
M'era Luna Festival	2000–present	Hildesheim, Germany	Goth, metal and industrial music
Lumous Gothic Festival	2001–2020	Finland	Genres such as gothic rock, deathrock, industrial, EBM and neofolk
C.O.M.A.	2004–2008	Montreal, Quebec, Canada	industrial, power electronics other alternative electronic musicians and DJs.
Eccentrik	2004–2009	Raleigh, North Carolina, U.S.	A 3-day industrial and goth music festival
Amphi Festival	2005–Present	Cologne, Germany	EBM/Industrial festival held at the Tanzbrunen in Cologne. The first year the festival was held at the Amphitheatre at Gelsenkirchen however it transferred to the Tanzbrunnen, Cologne in 2006. The festival is held over 2 days in late July and audience numbers are typically around 12,000 spectators per day. Currently the festival has three stages and typically hosts approximately 44 artists over the event
Blacksun Festival	2005–2007	New Haven, Connecticut, U.S.	3-day industrial and goth music international festival
Distorted Music Festival	2005	Melbourne, Australia	One year EDM festival that featured underground/mainstream electronic artists, with the genres of breakcore, IDM, noise, industrial, power noise, and glitch
Kinetik Festival	2008–2013	Canada	C.O.M.A. was essentially replaced by the Kinetik Festival
Resistanz	2011–2016, 2020-?	Sheffield, United Kingdom	Large industrial music festival
Aftermath Festival	2014–2015	Toronto, Ontario, Canada	In 2014, Kinetik was replaced by Aftermath, with many bands that were originally intended to play Kinetik.
EBM Dark Souls	2015–2019	Bratislava, Slovakia	A small industrial/Dark Electro/EBM/dark ambient festival which for the first time was organized for one evening in 2015. EBM Dark Souls 2016 edition consisted of two evenings
Natale Industriale	2022–2025	Hell Fire Club, Rome, Italy	Industrial Music Festival, main artists during the years: Humanima Collettivo Industriale, Cristiano Santini from Disciplinatha/Dish-Is-Nein, Pankow, Carnera, Gianluca Becuzzi from Limbo, Ain Soph, La Grazia Obliqua.
Wrocław Industrial Festival	2001-present	Wrocław, Poland	Yearly festival featuring artists spanning industrial and industrial-adjacent genres, such as dark ambient. Focusing on more atmospheric acts and a darker aesthetic, it has been held in a renovated monastery.
Noize Of Life	2017-present	Mannheim, Germany	Industrial, power electronics, and other alternative electronic performers.
Dark Force Fest	2023-present	Parsippany, New Jersey, U.S.	Yearly 3-day goth music festival put on by Vampirefreaks.com. Features industrial/aggrotech, goth rock and darkwave artists.

== Gallery ==
The following is a gallery of music festivals focused largely on industrial music (as compared to gothic music):

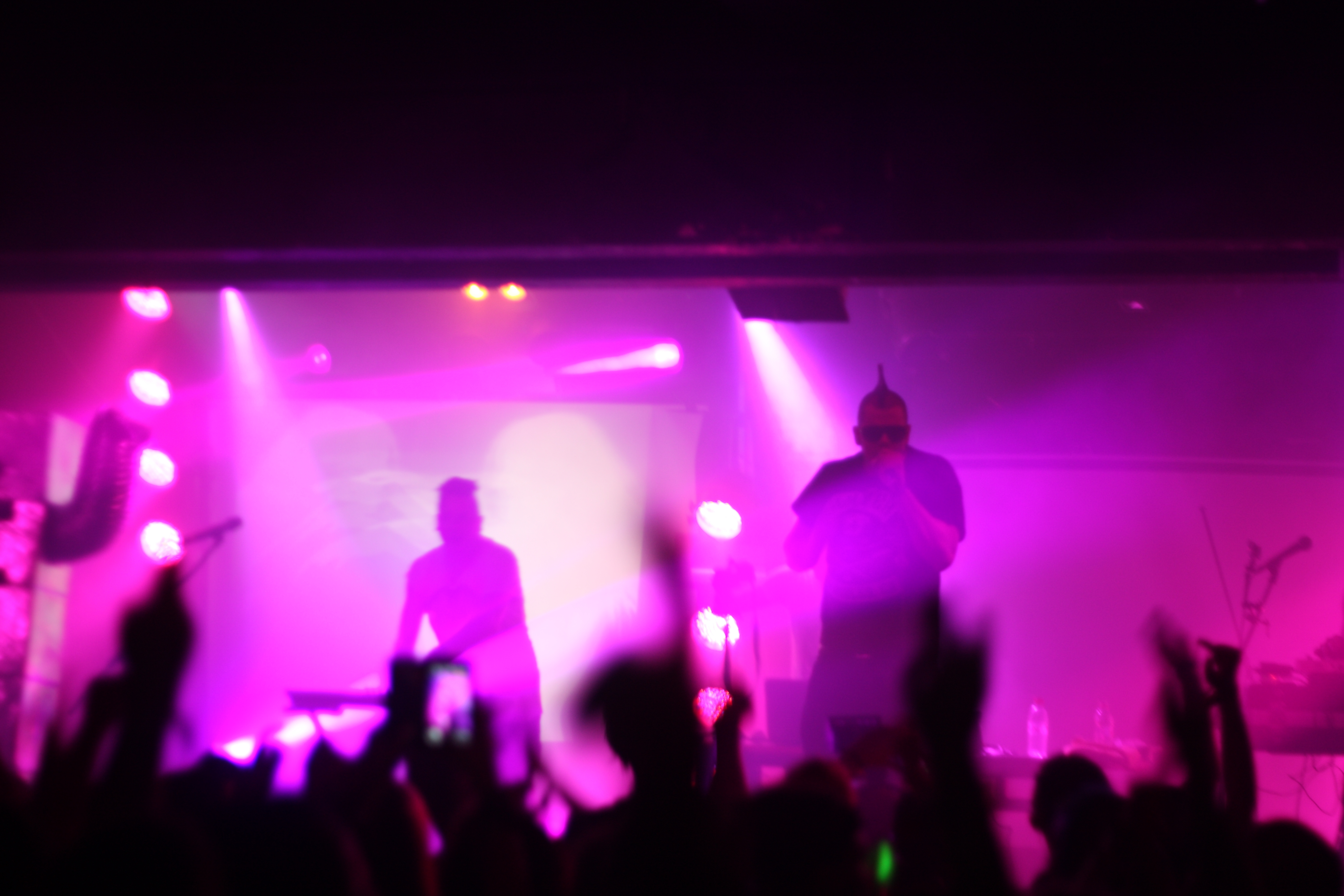

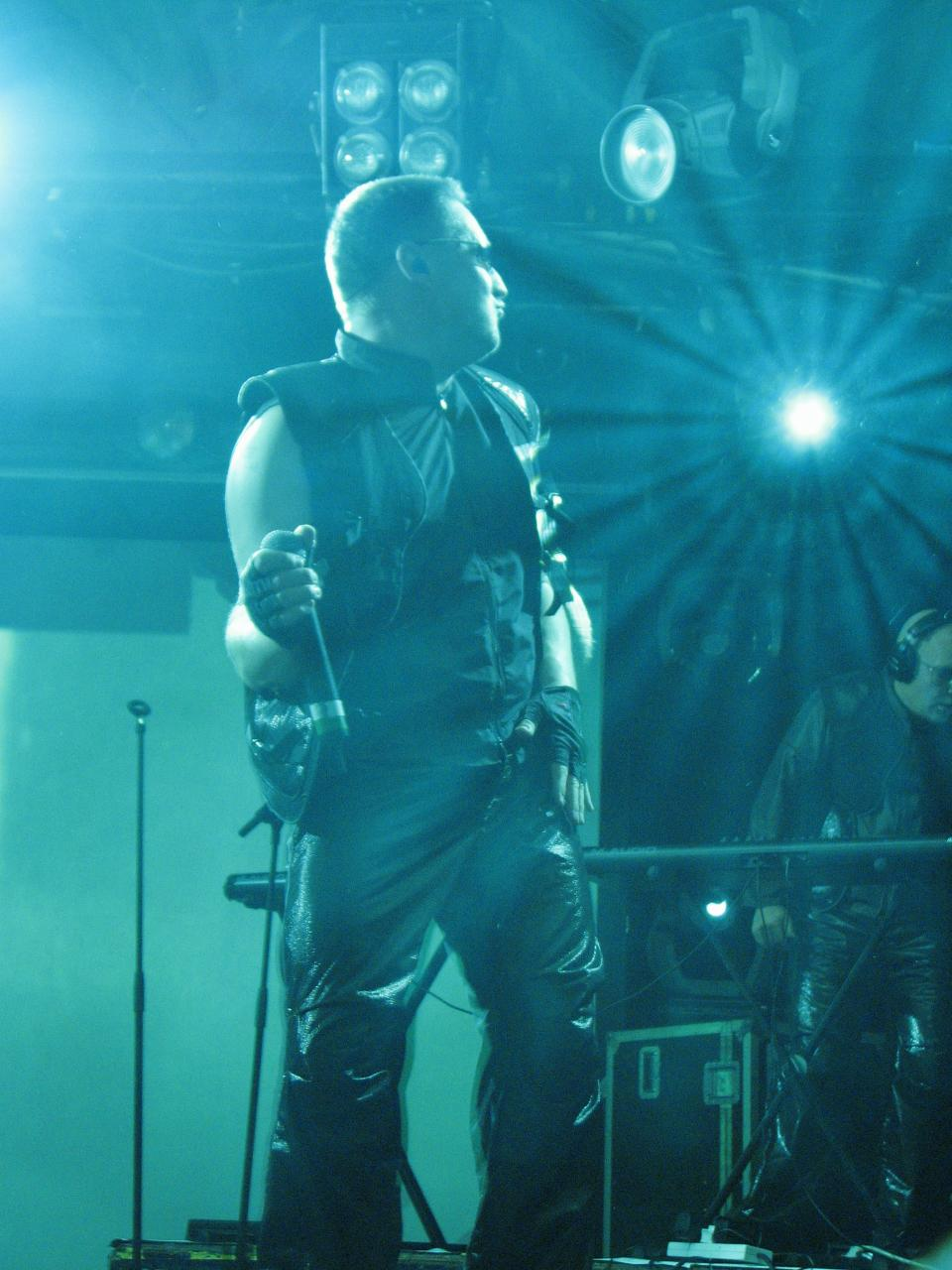

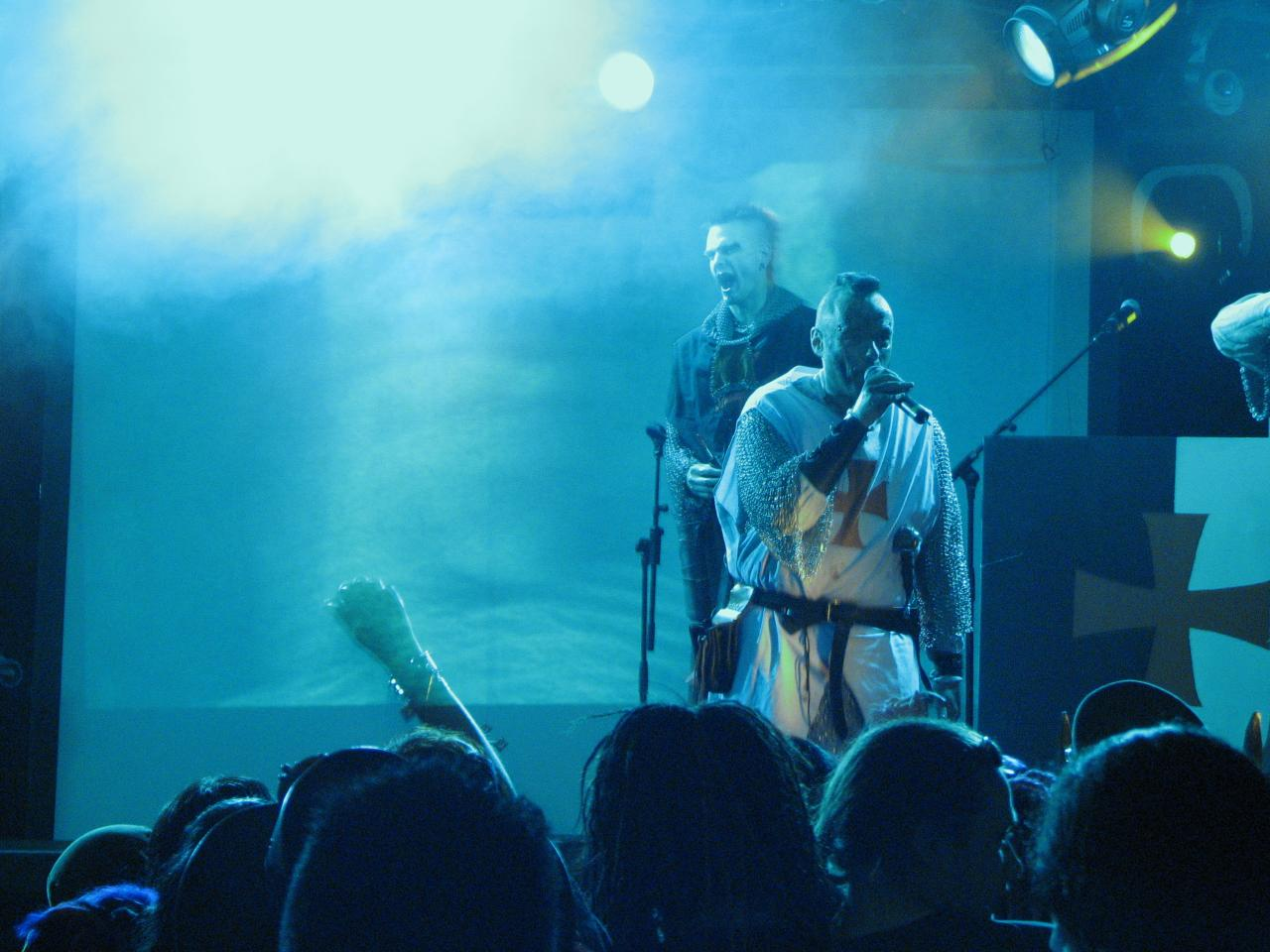

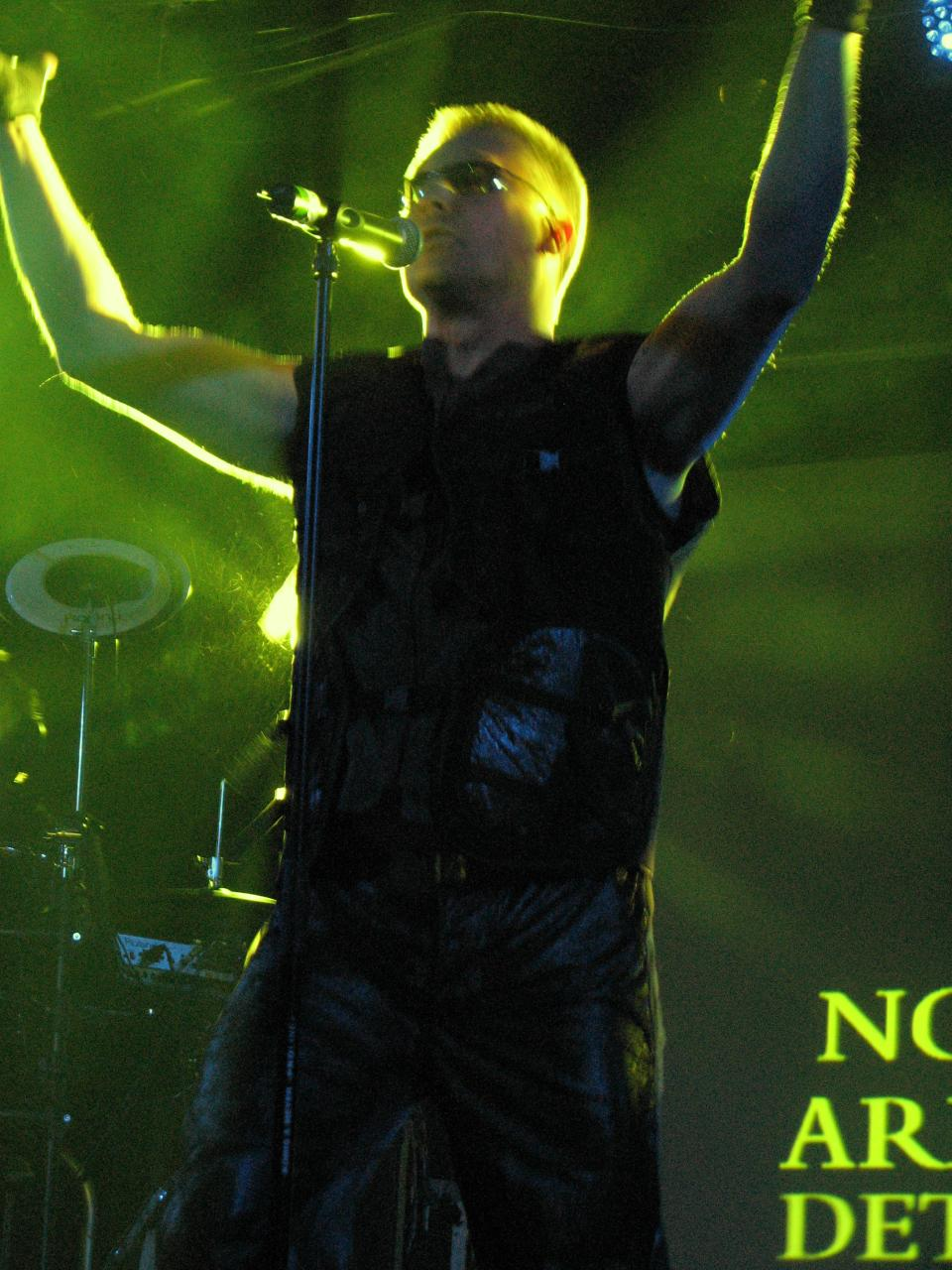

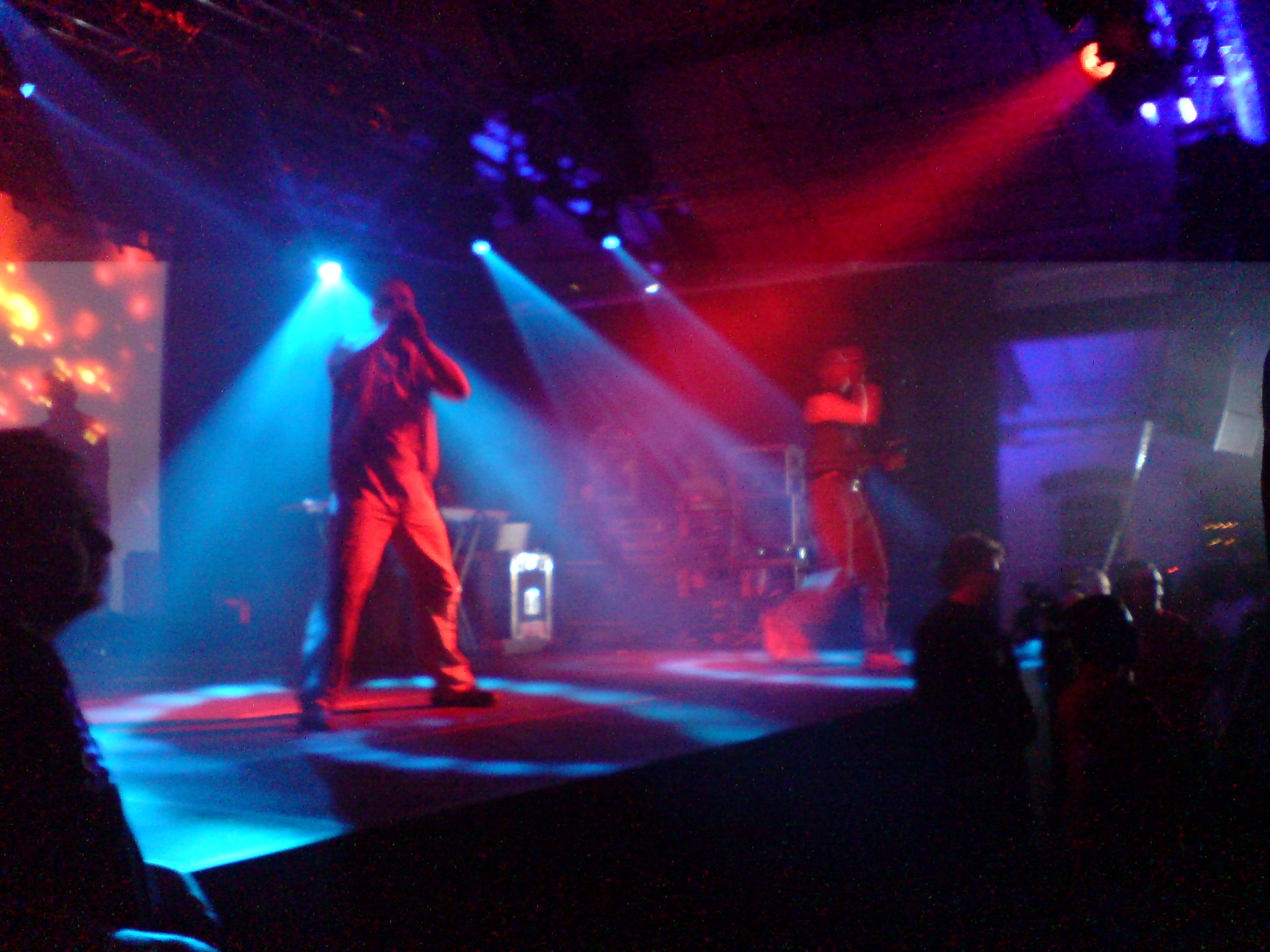

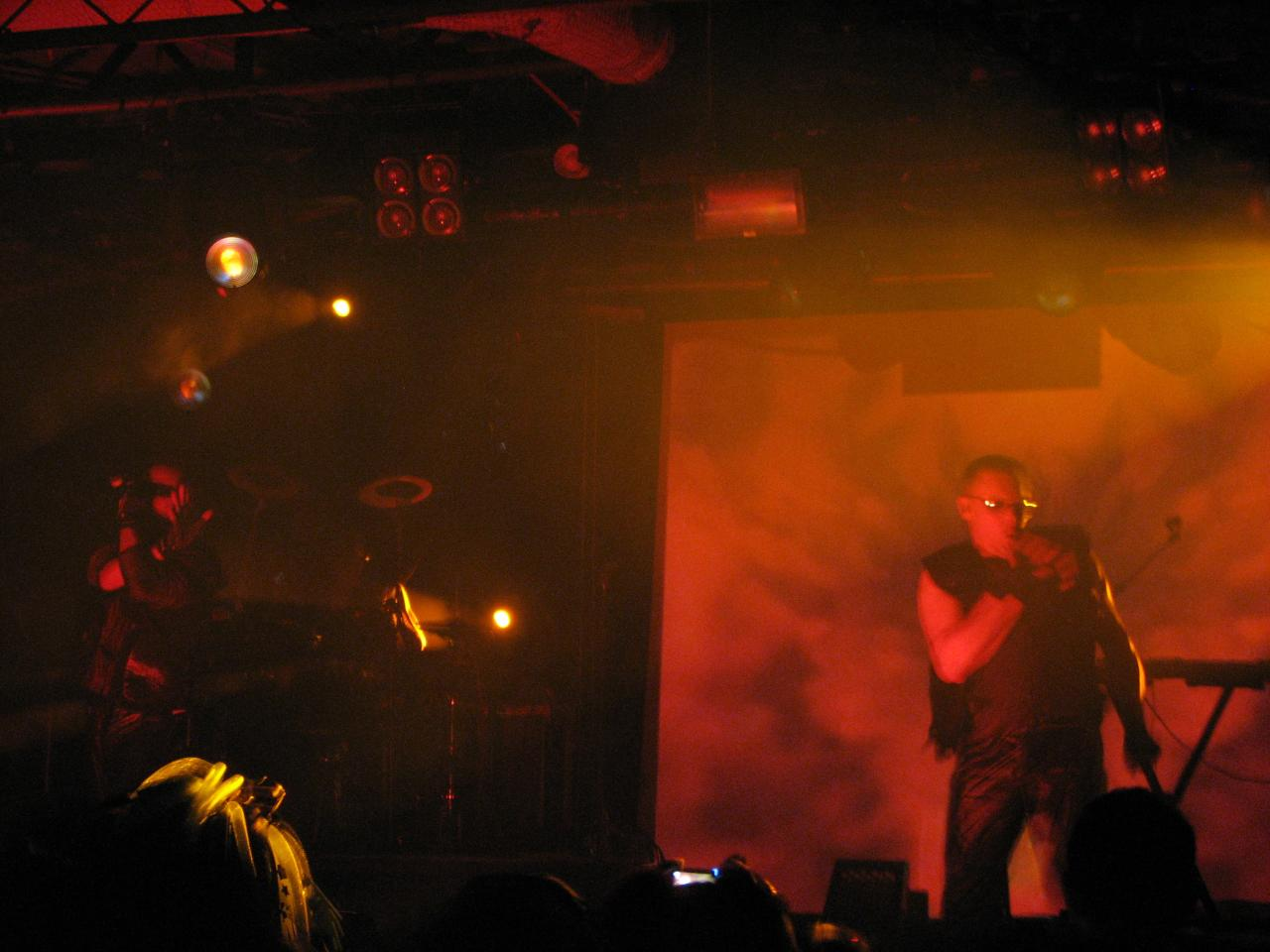

== See also ==
- List of music festivals
- List of electronic music festivals
- List of gothic festivals
- List of heavy metal festivals
- Music festivals
- Experimental music festivals
- Industrial music festivals
