= Placebo Effect (band) =

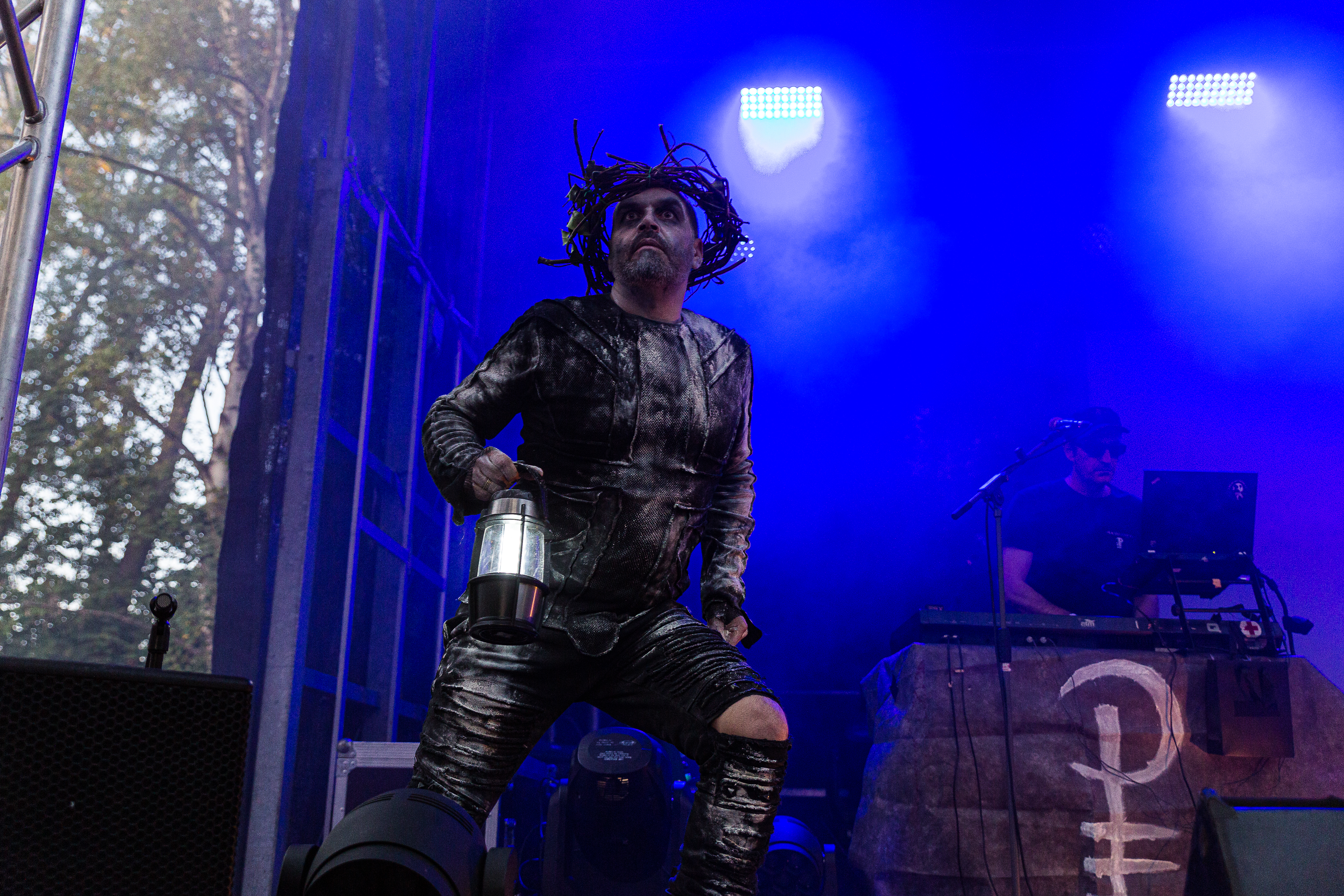
- Axel Machens (l) & Christoph Kunze (r)

Background information
- Origin: Duderstadt/Hildesheim, Germany
- Genres: Industrial, electro-industrial, Dark Electro
- Years active: 1989-1995, 2014–present
- Labels: Danse Macabre; Ausfahrt; Infacted Recordings
- Members: Axel Machens, Christoph Kunze
- Past members: Achim Windel (1989-2016)

Placebo Effect is a German dark electro band formed in 1989.

== History ==
The band was formed in the late 1980s by Axel Machens (vocals, synth, harmonizer, drum computer), Christoph Kunze (vocals, synth, sampler, percussions) and Achim Windel (vocals, sampler, sequencer, synth). Axel met Christoph in a club in 1989 where Christoph was an EBM DJ. The pair soon discovered that they each owned a synthesizer which led them to begin experimenting with making music together. Achim soon joined Christoph and Axel and the trio began making recordings on four track tapes.

After self-producing several cassette tapes, the band recorded their first full-length album, Galleries of Pain, in 1992. The album was recorded and mixed with the assistance of Bruno Kramm of Das Ich at his Danse Macabre Studio, then released on Kramm's Danse Macabre label. The band informally credited Bruno as the fourth "secret" band member in the studio not only due to his production assistance, but owing to the availability of his studio's electronic music equipment which greatly expanded on what the band had available at the time. Galleries of Pain is considered by many to be a classic EBM album.

Two releases followed Galleries - the Slashed Open EP in 1993 and Manipulated Mind Control in 1994. The creation of Manipulated Mind Control became a turning point for the band due to difficulties during production, resulting in a release that some fans considered a disappointment. External pressures to produce dancefloor oriented tracks in opposition to the band's characteristic atmospherics and internal conflicts left the band not on talking terms post-production. Frustrated and not having the energy to work on new material, the band released a compendium of earlier and rare material in order to finish out their contract with Ausfahrt records. Other than a pair of live shows in 1999 and 2004, the band was effectively defunct until 2014.

In 2011, as part of the Infacted Recordings classics collection, Gargoyles & Galleries was re-mastered and released worldwide limited to 1000 copies. Tracks 1-14 were originally released as the 1992 debut album Galleries of Pain. Tracks 15 to 18 were originally released as the 1990 demo tape Gargoyles.

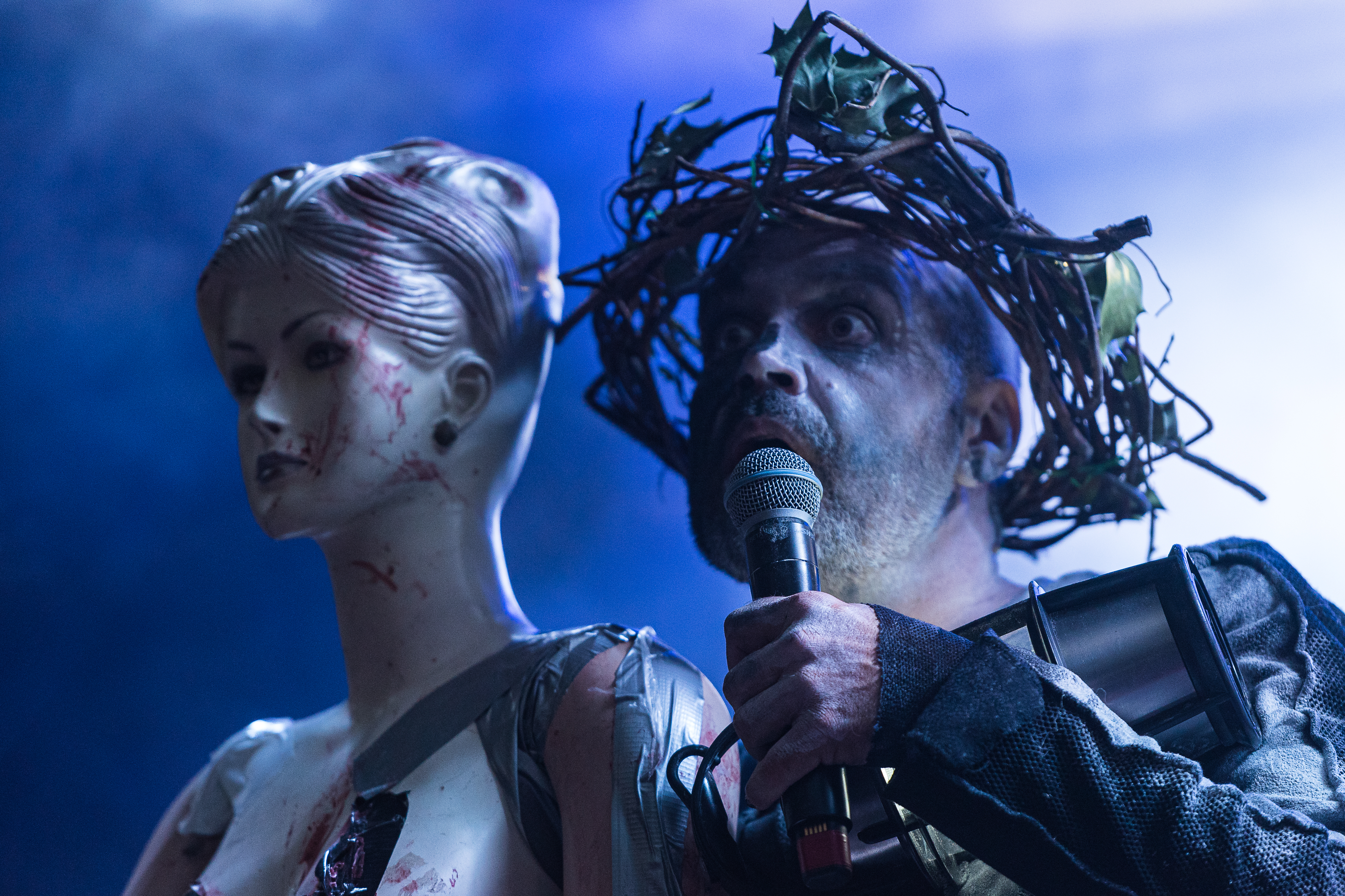
Axel Machens of Placebo Effect at Nocturnal Culture Night 14 2019 in Deutzen, Germany.

Placebo Effect played live at the Wave-Gotik-Treffen Leipzig in June 2014 – their first live WGT concert since 2004. The setlist included 2 new songs "Nothing to Cry" and "Slave." The same year, the band re-released Slashed Open as a Limited Deluxe Edition on Purple Vinyl, hand numbered (500 copies) in Gatefold-Cover, including two bonus tracks and one remix.

In 2016, founding member Achim Windel died unexpectedly. Achim's death brought Axel and Christoph back into contact and began talk of new collaboration.

In 2017 the remaining two members of the group announced work on a new album, Shattered Souls. The group went on to play live shows in 2018 at the Dark EBM Souls international industrial festival in Bratislava, Slovakia, at Das Bett in Frankfurt, Germany, and the Fortyfication-Festival in Berlin. Live shows continued into 2019 at Nocturnal Culture Night in Deutzen, Germany and Sala 0 in Madrid, Spain.

In October 2020, the band released Shattered Souls — their first studio album in 26 years. The album was produced by Arnte of the band Pyrroline, for whom Placebo Effect contributed two bonus remixes for his 2021 album Struggling.

== Side projects ==
In 1995, Placebo Effect parted ways, but Axel Machens collaborated with Ecki Stieg to form the side project "Accessories" and cut an album entitled Vendetta.

In 1999, Machens performed his solo-project called "Breathe" and cut The Laughing Dolls EP and several single mixes. Breathe live performances also consist of keyboardists Sascha Garthof and Daniel Sachse, and drummer Nick Zärban.

== Discography ==
=== Studio albums & EPs ===
Placebo Effect

- Released: 1989
- Format: Cassette
- Label: self-produced
- Tracks: "Human Flesh", "Devil's Hand", "Into The Ground", "Kill The Fight", "The Beast Within", "Obsession"

Gargoyles

- Released: 1990
- Format: Cassette
- Label: Danse Macabre
- Tracks: "Move", "Galery Of Pain", "Last Day", "Hard Work"

Galleries of Pain

- Released: 1992
- Format: CD/LP/Cassette/Digital
- Label: Danse Macabre (1992), self-released (2017)
- Producer: Bruno Kramm
- Tracks: "Mystress", "Intoxication", "Psychotrauma", "Poison Tree", "Brain Entrophy", "Galleries Of Pain (Bloody Pain Remix)", "Intersection", "Move (Animation Remix)", "Psychological Drama", "Devoid Of Soul (Salvitation Remix)", "Autopsia", "Agony Of Mind", "Dawn And Death", "Lumph"

Slashed Open

- Released: 1993
- Format: CD/LP, Ltd/Digital
- Label: Ausfahrt (1993), self-released (2014 & 2017)
- Tracks: "Slashed Open", "Decay", "Dreamland", "Broken Mirrors", "Painted Flowers In A Picture", "Pinhead"

Manipulated Mind Control

- Released: 1994
- Format: CD/Digital
- Label: Ausfahrt (1994 & 2013), self-released (2017)
- Producer: Ulrich Hornberg
- Tracks: "Opening Title C.A.3", "Rough Vibes", "Trauma", "No Man's Land", "Tears For The Broken Rainbow", "Last Walk (Through My Life)", "Eye On The Past", "Aura", "I Don't Care", "Placebo", "Digital Transmit", "Emergency", "Instrumental Vibes", "Care! (SH-09-Mix)"

Live Bochum Zeche

- Released: 1995
- Format: VHS
- Label: self-released
- Tracks: "Placebo", "Slashed Open", "Digital Transmit", "No Man's Land", "Poison Tree", "Agony Of Mind", "Eye On The Past", "Galleries Of Pain", "Devoid Of Soul", "Mistress", "Last Walk", "Rough Vibes", "Move", "I Don't Care", "Nerves", "Psychotrauma", "Decay", "Hard Work", "Video Clip", "Slashed Open"

MCMLXXXIX-MCMXCV Past...Present

- Released: 1996
- Format: CD Box, Ltd/Digital
- Label: Ausfahrt (1996), self-released (2017)
- Tracks: "Chlorid", "Alien", "Move", "Gallery Of Pain", "Last Day", "Hard Work", "Last Day (Hole I Mix)", "Sacrifice", "Human Flesh", "Kill The Fight", "Devil's Hand", "Into The Ground", "The Beast Within", "Obsession", "Nervous", "Slashed Open", "Last Walk"

Gargoyles & Galleries

- Released: 2011
- Format: CD, Ltd
- Label: Infacted Recordings (2011)
- Tracks: "Mystress", "Intoxication", "Psychotrauma", "Poison Tree", "Brain Entrophy", "Galleries Of Pain (Bloody Pain Remix)", "Intersection", "Move (Animation Remix)", "Psychological Drama", "Devoid Of Soul (Salvitation Remix)", "Autopsia", "Agony Of Mind", "Dawn And Death", "Lumph", "Move", "Gallery Of Pain", "Last Day", "Hard Work"

Shattered Souls

- Released: 2020
- Format: CD/Digital
- Label: self-released
- Producer: Arnte
- Tracks: "Dead And Buried", "Open Dead Eyes", "Evil Dead Trap", "D.E.S.T.R.U.C.T.I.O.N.", "Crystal White Snow", "Feed Your Creatures", "Pain", "Down On Your Knees", "Hard Work", "P.A.R.T.", "Slave", "Shattered Souls", "V.O.I.C.E.S.", "Nothing To Cry", "L.A.S.T"

=== Compilation appearances ===
- Official Techno Club Compilation Volume 2 - CD
- Electronic Techno Music - LP
- Danse Macabre Sampler I - CD Danse Macabre (1991)
- Danse Macabre Sampler II - CD Danse Macabre (1992)
- Celtic Circle Sampler Part I - CD Celtic Circle Productions (1993)
- Electrocity Vol. 4 - CD Ausfahrt Records (1993)
- Moonraker - CD Subterranean (1994)
- Body Rapture 3 - CD Zoth Ommog (1994)
- Art and Dance Volume 5 - CD Gothic Arts (1994)
- We Came to Dance Vol. 3 - CD Subterranean (1994)
- Touched by the Hand of Goth Vol. II - CD Subterranean (1996)
