= Distorted Music Festival =

Australian electronic music festival

Coordinates: 37°48′49″S 144°57′47″E

- Logo of the Distorted Music Festival
- Genre: Industrial; noise; power noise; breakcore; IDM; glitch
- Dates: 10 December 2005
- Locations: Brown Alley, Melbourne, Victoria
- Years active: 2005
- Website: distorted.com.au

The Distorted Music Festival was an Australian electronic music festival held at Melbourne's Brown Alley on 10 December 2005.

It showcased electronic artists who are not generally considered to be mainstream. It covered the musical genres of industrial, noise, power noise, breakcore, IDM and glitch.

The philosophy of the festival is to bring to Australia international acts who would otherwise never play in the country. The festival also showcases local Australian artists, giving them the chance to play alongside the big names in the scene.

== Band lineup ==
- 2005: Architect, Black Lung, Cambion, Converter, the Crystalline Effect, Defused Fusion, Delta of Venus, Enduser, EPA, Jetlag, Killjoy, Maladroit, Mechanised Convulsions, Mono No Aware, the Mutagen Server, Noistruct, n0nplus, Null Hypothesis, Scorn, Vespine, Xian.
- (The USA band C/A/T was invited, but unable to attend.)

== See also ==
- List of industrial music festivals
- List of electronic music festivals
