= Bats Day in the Fun Park =

Annual three-day event near Disneyland

- Genre: Electronic music, gothic music, industrial music
- Locations: Anaheim, California, United States and Disneyland
- Years active: 1999– present
- Founders: Absynthe and Release the Bats

Bats Day in the Fun Park, also known as Bats Day, Goth Day, Goth Day at Disneyland, The Spooky Trip to Disneyland Resort, California., Bats Day in the Park and Bats Day Out, started in August 1999 as a joint effort between the promoters of the goth, industrial, and deathrock clubs Absynthe and Release the Bats. It has become an annual three-day event taking place in Anaheim, California, United States near Disneyland. In previous years, the events commenced on the weekend before Labor Day. Since about 2008, Bats Day event weekends have usually happened on the first or third weekend in May.

== Events ==
Group picture in front of Sleeping Beauty Castle on Bats Day 2013

For several years, Bats Day in the Fun Park had six events:

- The Bats Day Black Market - A large gathering of vendors selling darkly-inclined items, including clothing, music, artwork, books, collectibles, toys, and other original genre items.
- The Bats Day Ghoulish Gala (originally called The Bats Day Creepy Cocktail Party) - This event typically happens the night of the Black Market, and is a catered hors d'œuvres cocktail party with a raffle.
- The Nightmare Before Bats Day Dinner - A full sit down dinner.
- The Bats Day Dark Park Festival - A live music and DJ event festival geared to the Dark Alternative Subculture. This event was added in 2008.
- The Bats Day Happy Haunts Swing Wake: A Costumed Celebration - A new event as of 2011, this is a costumed gala event where attendees are required to dress as the undead or their favorite Disneyland Haunted Mansion character. Creativity is celebrated, and costumes and characters from all time periods are encouraged to attend and celebrate the afterlife. This event happens Friday night, the start of the weekend of events, and is a catered hors d'œuvres cocktail party for the first hour, with a raffle, DJs and live entertainment.
- Bats Day in the Fun Park - The Big Spooky Trip to Disneyland. Bats Day patrons dress in their Gothic attire for the annual visit to either Disneyland Park or Disney California Adventure Park, depending where the event is being held. There are other scheduled events and gatherings on this day, including a large group picture in front of Sleeping Beauty Castle, group pictures at the Haunted Mansion, and a photo scavenger hunt.

== History ==
The event started as a relatively small goth "meet up" event of about 80 people from two dance clubs, Absynthe and Release the Bats. It has grown to include more aspects of the goth subculture. Other dark subcultures represented at the event include Horror punk, Halloween, Rockabilly, Psychobilly, Black metal, Steampunk, Hearse Societies, Industrial and EBM. Noah Korda, a graphic artist and club promoter in Los Angeles, is the organizer of the event.

The event draws people from not only the local area but all over the world, including New Zealand, England, Brazil, France, Germany and Mexico. It has evolved into a family friendly event as well. Parents in this subculture are able to bond with their children at the "Happiest Place on Earth" more comfortably at an event such as this one, whereas they might be regarded as out-of-place on any other weekend at Disneyland or other theme parks.

An article on the event appeared in the June 2009 issue of Gothic Beauty Magazine.

Though there are rumors that this event occurred due to the success of a similar event called 'Baumaus', the two clubs promoting this event claim that they had no idea that 'Baumaus' ever happened.

Bats Day in the Fun Park helped solidify and push the DisneyGoth community into the public eye.

The event turned 20 years in May 2018 and is going back to its roots of just a park meet, for the time being.

== See also ==
- List of gothic festivals
- List of industrial music festivals
- List of electronic music festivals
