= Placebo (disambiguation) =

A placebo is a substance or treatment without intrinsic therapeutic value but administered as if it were a therapy, whether in medical treatment or in clinical trials.

Placebo may also refer to:

- Placebo (band), an English alternative rock band
  - Placebo (Placebo album), the band's 1996 debut album
- Placebo, a Belgian jazz band fronted by Marc Moulin
  - Placebo, the band's 1974 self-titled album
- Placebo (ASP album), a 2022 album by ASP

== See also ==
- Placebo effect (disambiguation)
- Nocebo, a harmless substance that creates negative psychologically induced response in a patient
