= EBM Dark Souls =

Industrial music festival in Slovakia (2015–2019)

Dark EBM Souls
- Genre: Industrial music
- Dates: 23.03.2019
- Location: Bratislava, Slovakia
- Years active: 2015-2019
- Founders: Jozef Sarina, Martin Kmeto
- Capacity: approx. 200
- Website: /Dark EBM Souls/ Official Website

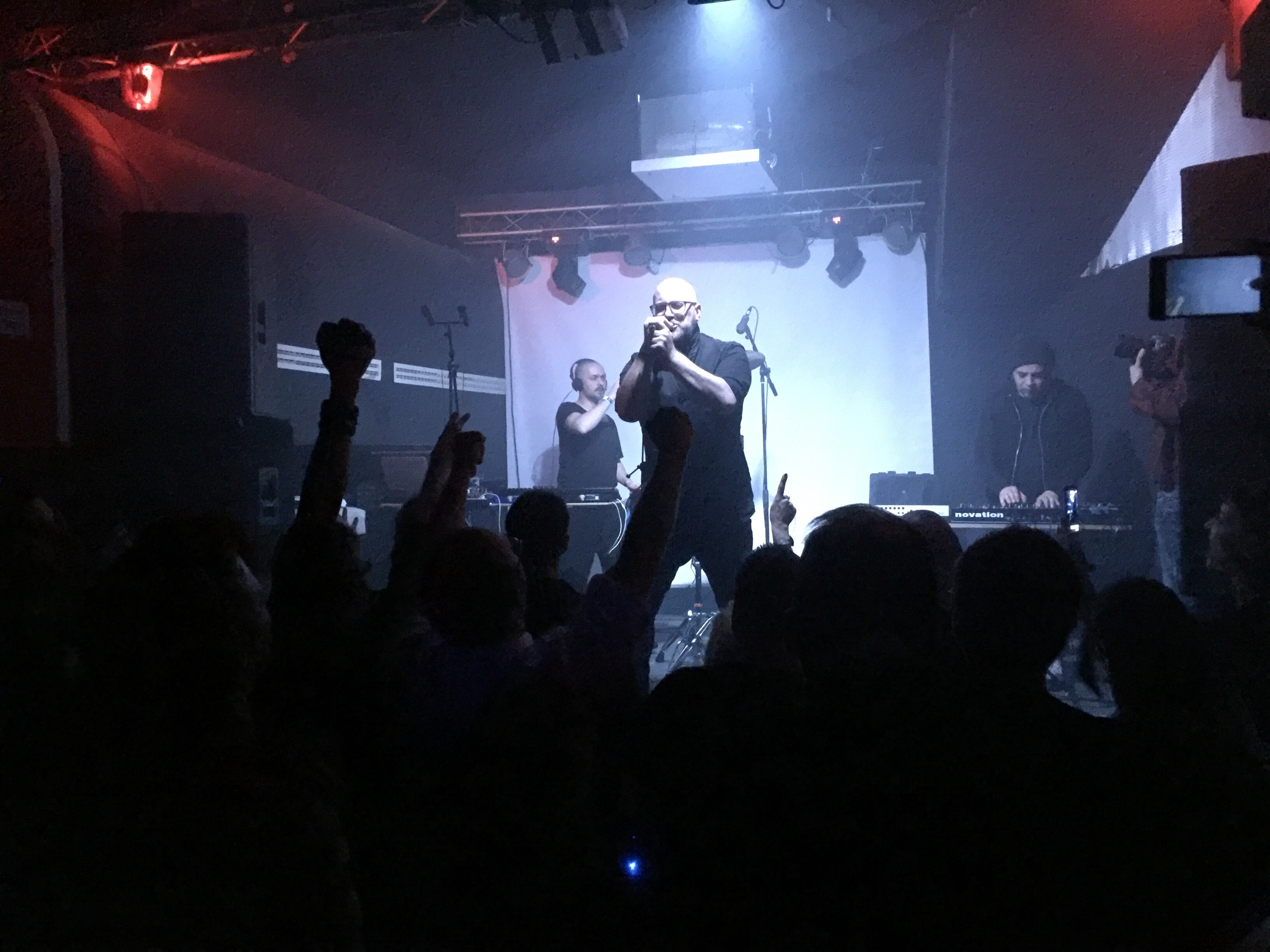
Haujobb at Dark EBM Souls v3

Dark EBM Souls was an annual small international industrial festival held in Bratislava, Slovakia, in February 2015 with successors in 2016, 2017, 2018 and 2019.

Dark EBM Souls is mainly focused on the genres electro-industrial and dark ambient.

== Edition v1 2015 ==
The v1 edition was hosted in Bratislava as a one-day event 28.02.15 with the lineup: ISH, Terminal State, Jihad, Kifoth, MC1R and Fïx8:Sëd8.

== Edition v2 2016 ==
The v2 edition was a 2-day event in Bratislava 26.02.16 - 27.02.16 with the lineup: Vomito Negro, Fïx8:Sëd8, The Opposer Divine, tri-state, kFactor, kleqq, ISH, Fjordwalker, Kifoth and Jihad .

== Edition v3 2017 ==
The v3 edition was a one day event in Bratislava 11.02.17 with the lineup: Frontier Guards, 2nd Face, Amnistia, Gaping Chasm, Haujobb and Samhain .

== Edition v4 2018 ==
The fourth edition of Dark EBM souls was a one night event 10 March 2018 in Bratislava with the lineup: Dive, Placebo Effect, Fïx8:Sëd8, Last Influence of Brain, Proleturan and Full contact 69.

== Edition v5 2019 ==
The v5 edition was a one night event 23.3.19. with the lineup: Architect, Amorphous, Cardinal Noire, Ecplipsed, Static Charge Disease.

== Recordings ==
The artist Jihad released a live album from the concert of the first festival edition of 2015.

== See also ==
- List of industrial music festivals
- List of electronic music festivals
