= List of gothic festivals =

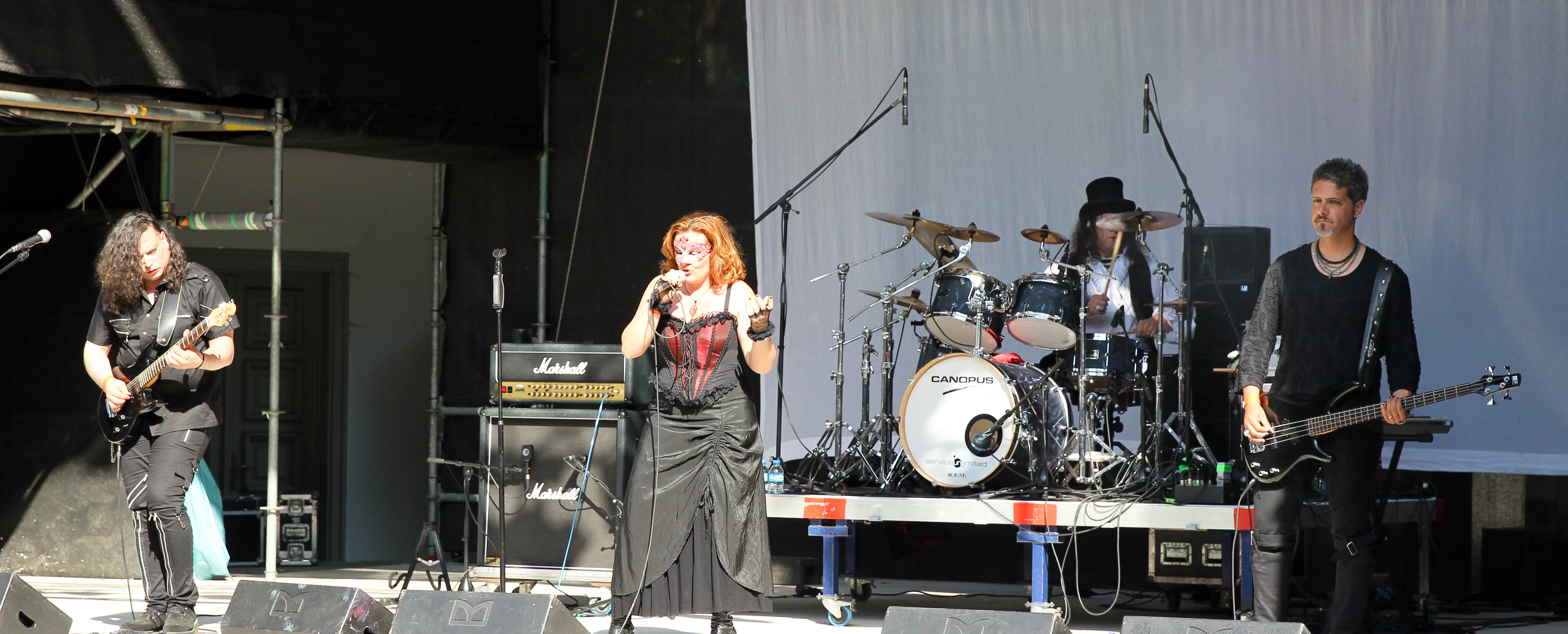
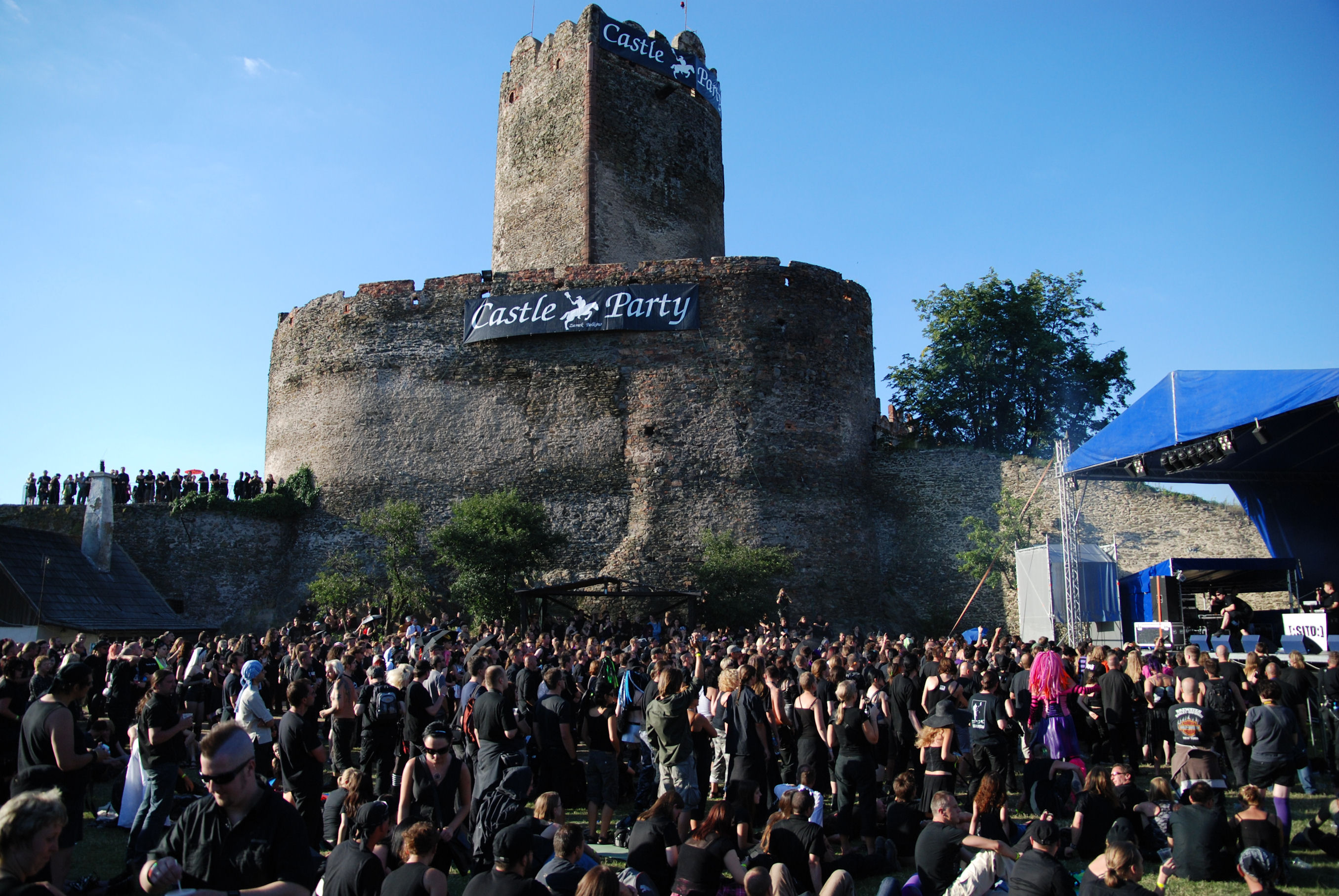
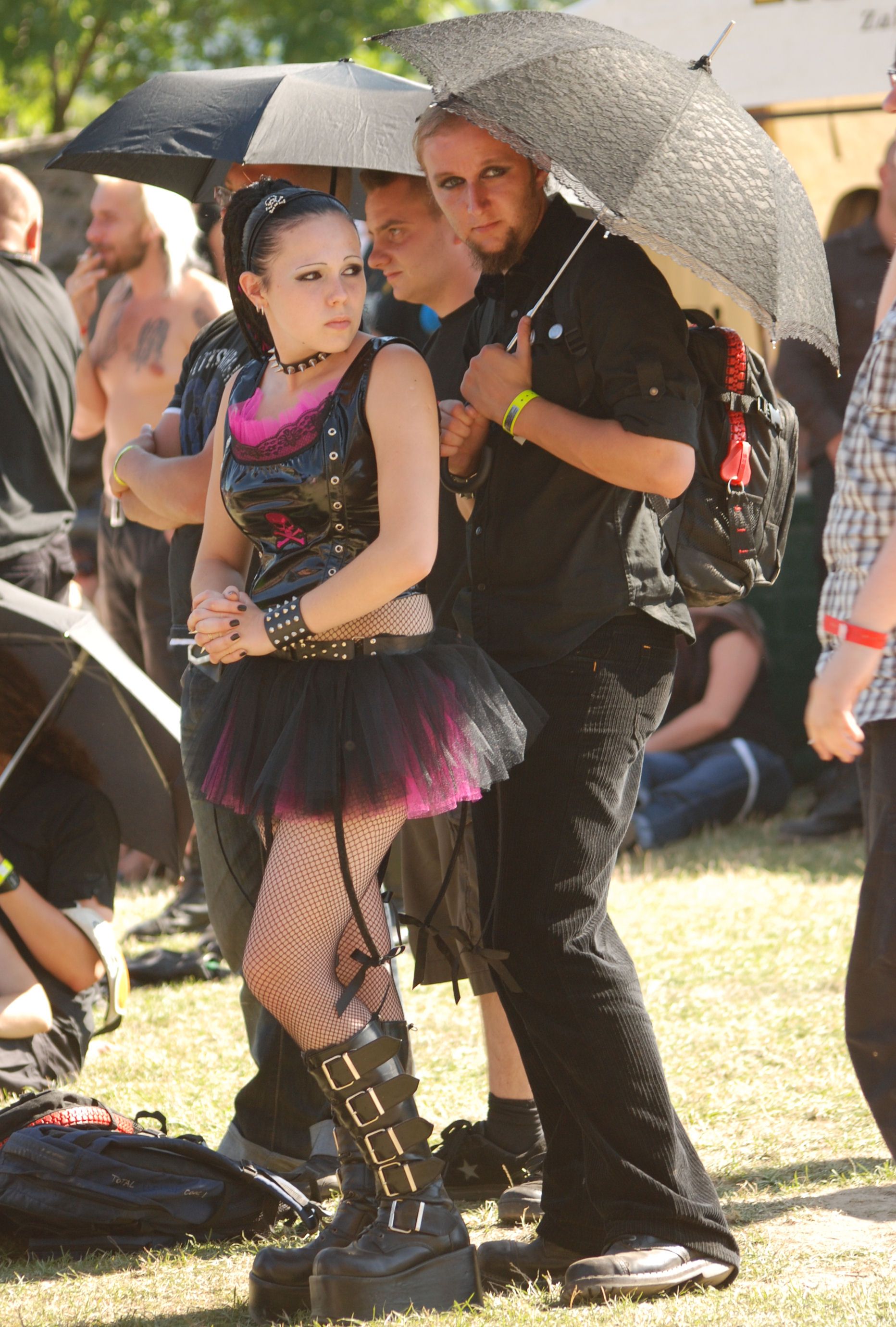

General Information
- Related genres: Gothic rock, gothic metal, dark wave, industrial music, cybergoth
- Location: Worldwide
- Related events: Concert tour, music festival, rock festival, heavy metal festival, electronic dance music festival, technoparade, teknival
- Related topics: Goth subculture, goth fashion

The following is an incomplete list of gothic festivals, which encapsulates music festivals focused on gothic music. Goth festivals may feature genres such as gothic rock and gothic metal, as well as industrial music. The festivals also tend to feature aspects of the Goth subculture, such as fans and bands in goth fashion. Goth is a musical subgenre of post-punk and alternative rock that formed during the late-1970s. Gothic rock bands grew from the strong ties they had to the English punk rock and emerging post-punk scenes. The genre itself was defined as a separate movement from post-punk due to its darker music accompanied by introspective and romantic lyrics. Gothic rock then gave rise to a broader subculture that included clubs, fashion and publications in the 1980s.

== Festivals ==
Name	Years active	Location	Notes	Picture
Wave-Gotik-Treffen	1987–present	Leipzig, Germany	One of the largest Gothic festivals in the world. A four-day event covering most of the city of Leipzig, Germany.	
Annual Gothic Cruise	1989–present	Florida, with one offs	This yearly weeklong event featuring bands across the many subcultures of the goth genre. Onboard dj parties & private events throughout the event. Must be 18 or over to attend private events. Food, drinks, and cabins included in base pricing.	
Whitby Goth Weekend	1994– present	Whitby, North Yorkshire, England	Twice-yearly goth music festival.	
Castle Party	1994–present	Poland	Above the town Bolków stand the ruins of Bolków Castle, built in the 13th century. Devastated in the Thirty Years' War it became a property of Grüssau Abbey in 1703, though restoration efforts did not begin until 1905. Since 1997 the ruin is the site of the annual "Castle Party" Gothic rock festival. First three editions were on Grodziec Castle.	
Convergence	1995–present	North America	Annual net.goth party run by and for members of the alt.gothic and alt.gothic.fashion newsgroup, and other related Usenet newsgroups. Events at Convergence typically included live bands and club nights, bazaars, fashion, art shows, panels, and tours of goth-themed locales in the host city. In recent years, however, the festival aspects of this event have been stripped away leaving the event transformed into a meet-up for old friends from past Convergences to get-together.	
Dark Storm Festival	1997–present	Germany	One day festival on Christmas Day, city hall of Chemnitz.	
Infest	1998–present	Bradford, England	An annual festival featuring a mixture of electronic, industrial and gothic music. The festival features club/DJ events, live concerts from established international artists & new bands to the scene, both clothes & music stalls.	
M'era Luna Festival	2000–present	Germany	A festival of goth, metal and industrial music. It is held annually on the second weekend of every August, in Hildesheim, Germany.	
Children of Night: Black Soviet	2000–present	Ukraine	A festival of goth, metal and industrial music. The largest on Ukraine and in the CIS festival of gothic/dark/electro music and art. Now a journey on a festival became annual tradition of admirers of gothic/dark/electro aesthetics from Russia, Ukraine, Belarus, Moldova and other former Soviet Union countries. Annually passes in September in Kyiv, Ukraine.	
Lumous Gothic Festival	2001–2020	Finland	Commonly known as Lumous, was the largest festival dedicated to the goth subculture in Finland and the northernmost Gothic festival in the world. covering musical genres such as gothic rock, deathrock, industrial, EBM and neofolk.	
Reverence	2003–2009	Madison, United States	An electronic music festival. Featuring primarily aggrotech, electro-industrial and synthpop bands, it has also included other electronic dance music genres as well.	
Summer Darkness	2003–2013	Utrecht, Netherlands	Acts perform in various clubs throughout the city of Utrecht. The festival was a joint venture by Cybercase, Tivoli (Utrecht), EKKO and Mojo until EKKO made the decision in 2009 to quit.	
Eccentrik	2004–2009	Raleigh, United States	A three-day industrial and goth music festival. Started in October 2004, Eccentrik features various musical styles including deathrock, gothabilly, industrial, gothic rock, psychobilly, post-punk, synthpop and other related genres.	
Lima Gothic Wave Festival	2004–present	Lima, Peru	An event that brings together the Peruvian and Latin American Gothic subculture.	
Amphi Festival	2005–present	Germany	A two-day festival of dark music. It is held annually on the third weekend of July, in Cologne, Germany.	
Blacksun Festival	2005–2007	New Haven, United States	Was created in 2005 is a three-day industrial and goth music international festival.	
Prague Gothic Treffen	2006–present	Prague, Czech Republic	Two-day festival of goth rock, EBM, darkwave, coldwave, synth and postpunk, DJs and picnic based in Prague clubs. PGT is held by a local goth webzine.	
Darkland Fire	2008–present	Rakvere, Estonia	The Neofolk/Dark folk /Industrial Music Festival DARKLAND FIRE.	
Sinner's Day festival	2009–2022	Belgium	Sinner's Day festival was one of Europe's New Wave/EBM/Goth festivals and consists of both a Summer and a Winter edition. The Summer edition is held annually during the last weekend of June in Ostend, Belgium, the Winter edition is held annually during the last weekend of October, Belgium. https://sinnersday.com/	
Dark Bombastic Evening	2009–2022	Romania	Was a festival spanning several days in Ryma, Alba Iulia, Romania.	
Extramuralhas	2010–present	Portugal	It's Portugal's biggest goth and industrial music festival. It is held annually on the last weekend of every August, in Leiria, Portugal. It used to be called Entremuralhas until 2018.	
Castrum Nigra	2011–2024	Brodenbach, Germany	One day festival within the complete castle Ehrenburg (Brodenbach) featuring a mixture of electronic, industrial and gothic music. The festival features DJ and club events, artists and performances.	
Dark Munich Festival	2012–2015	Munich, Germany	Used to be a gothic festival in Munich, but is now bankrupt.	
Runes & Men	2012–2016	Leipzig, Germany	Two day neofolk festival.	
San La Muerte Festival	2012, 2015–2023	Austin, United States	Was a Texas-based music festival for goth, deathrock, and dark punk musicians from across the world.	
Alt-Fest	2014	England	A crowd-sourced alternative music and lifestyle festival, intended to run from 2014 onwards at Boughton Estate, Kettering, England. The inaugural festival promised six stages and 180 bands, but instead, the event was cancelled due to lack of funding, with the controlling company consequently going into liquidation.	
Autumn Moon Festival	2015–present	Hamelin, Germany	Two day Gothic festival in October.	
SPECIES	2015–2022	County Leitrim, Ireland	Annual Gothic arts and culture gathering, a grass roots collaborative festival run by its creative contributors. Music from a diverse array of Ireland's dark, Gothic and Industrial DJs with live bands and Performances, Gothic Décor, Art Installations, Live painting, Gothic market and camping over a span of two nights and three days.	
Goth City	2016–2023	Leeds, England	A Leeds-based Goth festival over two weeks from 11 – 26 November.	
Subkultfestivalen	2016–present	Trollhättan, Sweden	Two-day culture festival with a focus on subcultures like goth, synth, postpunk, indie, metal, punk, emo, lolita, industrial & electronica.	
Gothic Dark Wave Festival	2017	Tilloloy Castle, France	A two-day festival with 22 bands, at a castle in the north of France. It took place on 19 and 20 August 2017. The festival is unlikely to have a second edition.	
Darkside of Belgrade	2017–present	Belgrade, Serbia	One day festival featuring a mixture of electronic, industrial and gothic music. The festival features club/DJ events, live bands and performances	
Deepland Festival	2017–present	São Paulo, Brazil	Goth music event held by Brazilian alternative record label Deepland Records.	
Cruel World Festival	2020–present	Brookside Golf Course in Pasadena, California	Festival around the new wave, post-punk, gothic rock and alternative rock genres.	
Dark Malta Festival	2018–present	Gianpula, Malta	Two-day festival featuring a mixture of EBM, industrial, gothic & Metal music. The festival features live bands, dj- & club-events.	
The Unconvention	2021–2023	New York City, New Jersey, Philadelphia Area, United States	The Unconvention was a 3-day festival. Iselin, NJ.	
Soul Noir:Festival of the Dark Arts	2017–2024	Dublin, Ireland	A Dublin based festival founded to celebrate all things Gothic, underground and macabre. Our aim is to promote Irish and international artists who work with these themes in their practice.	

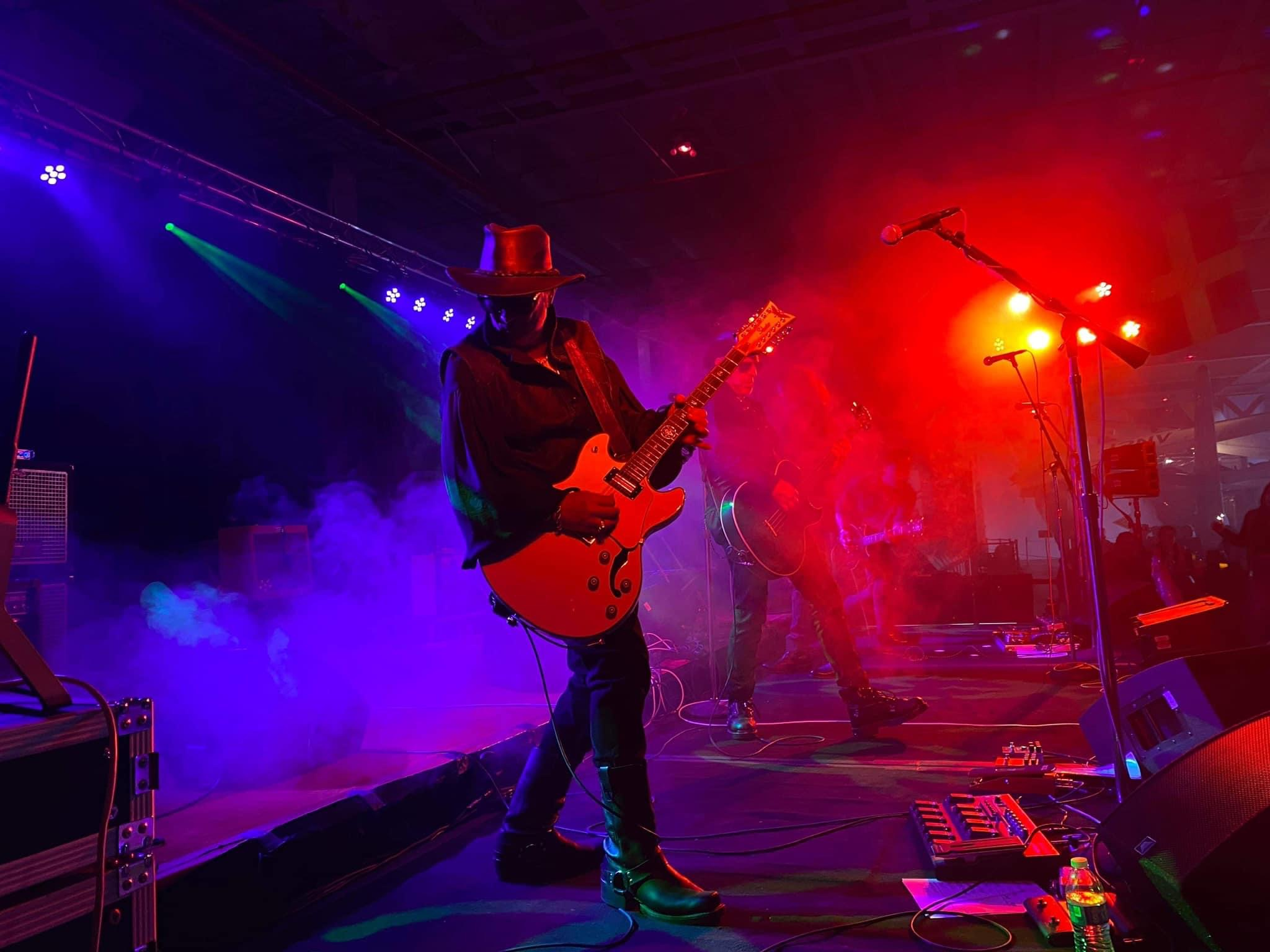
Michael Garcia of The Reptile House performing on stage at The Menagerie's 2nd Annual World Goth Festival on the USS Hornet in Alameda, CA 2022

|- |Setmana Santa:A Week of Goth Cults |2022–present |Toulouse, France |Created in Toulouse in 2022 by the association 31-13 and the DJ Konstroy, Setmana Santa is a series of events held in Toulouse every year from Monday to Sunday in the beginning of December, hosting concerts, exhibitions, films at movie theaters and various media related to gothic and post-punk culture. Most of the events offered take place in the city centre of Toulouse in southwestern France.

== Gallery ==
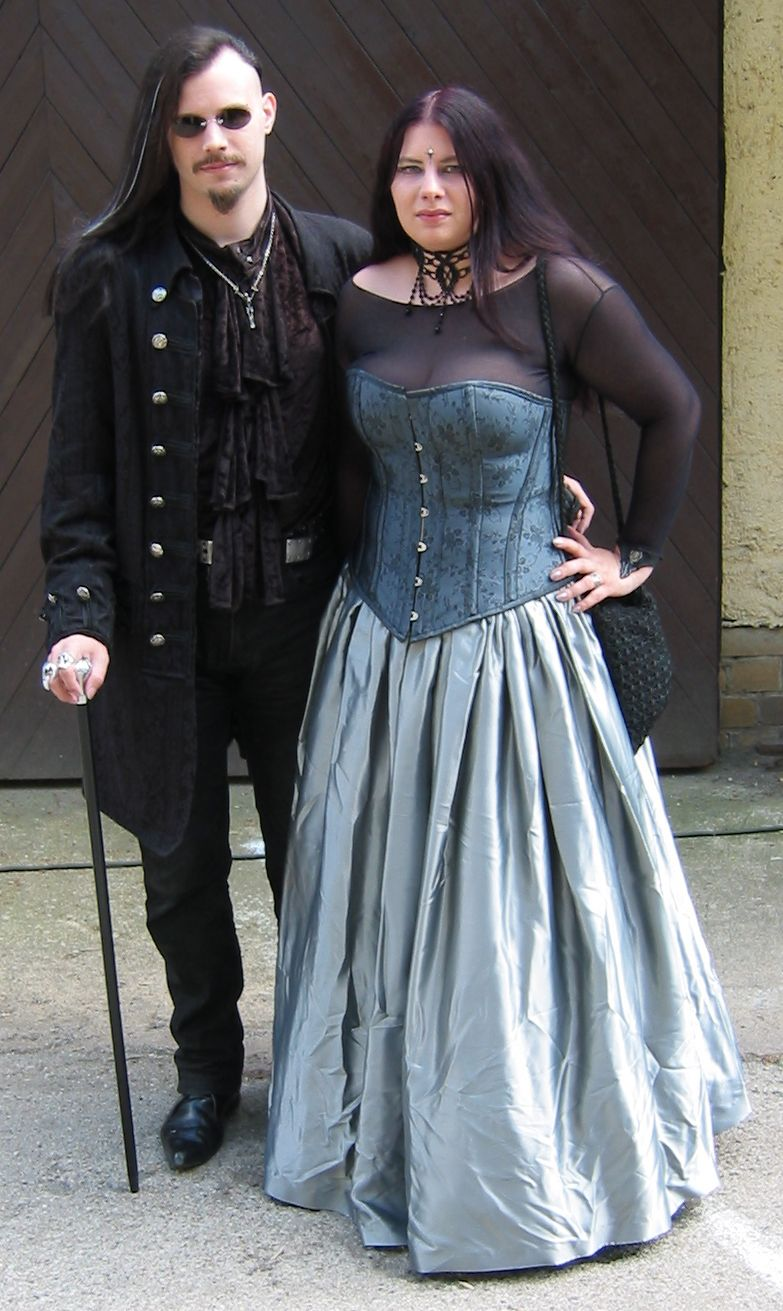
Fans at Wave-Gotik-Treffen in 2004

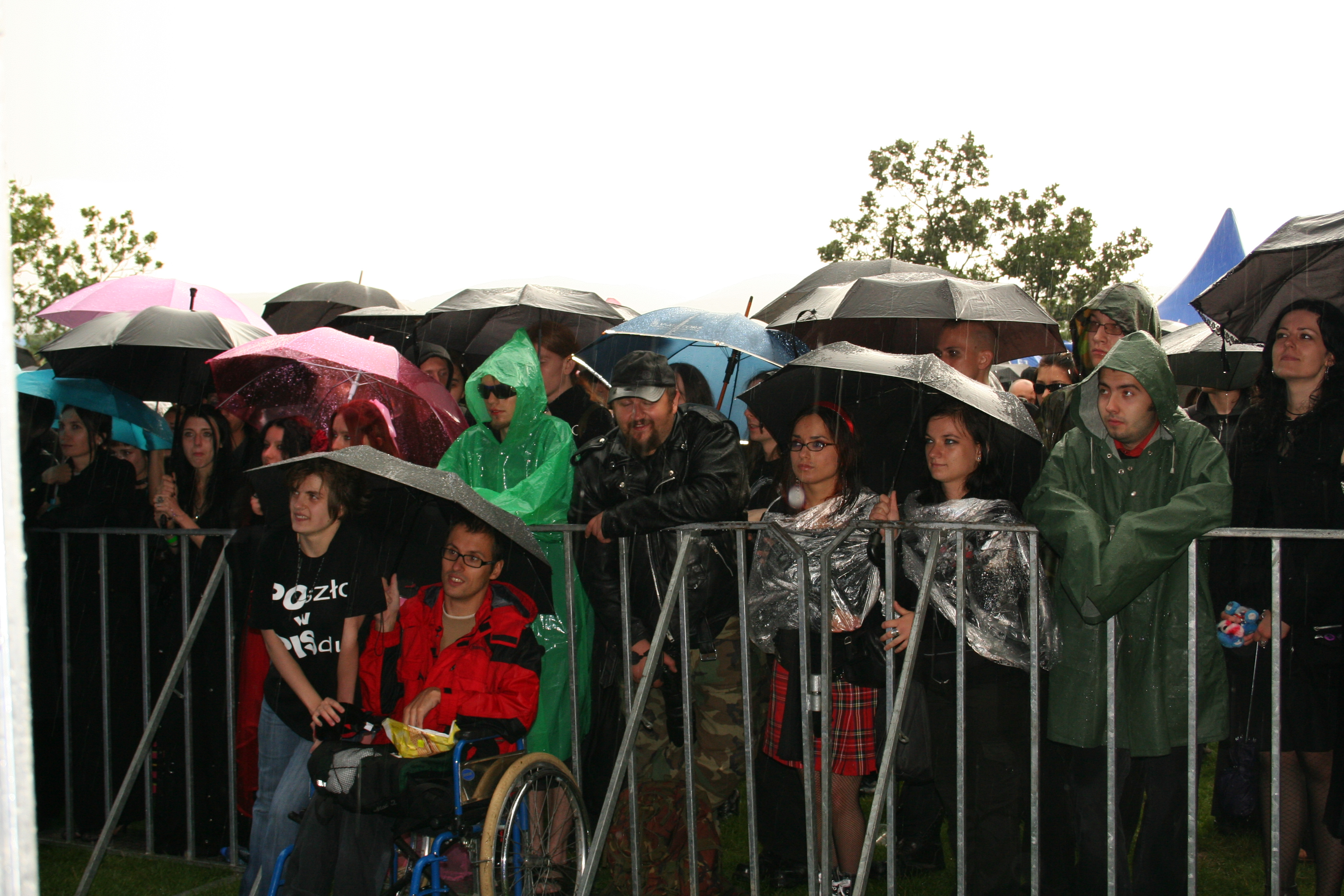

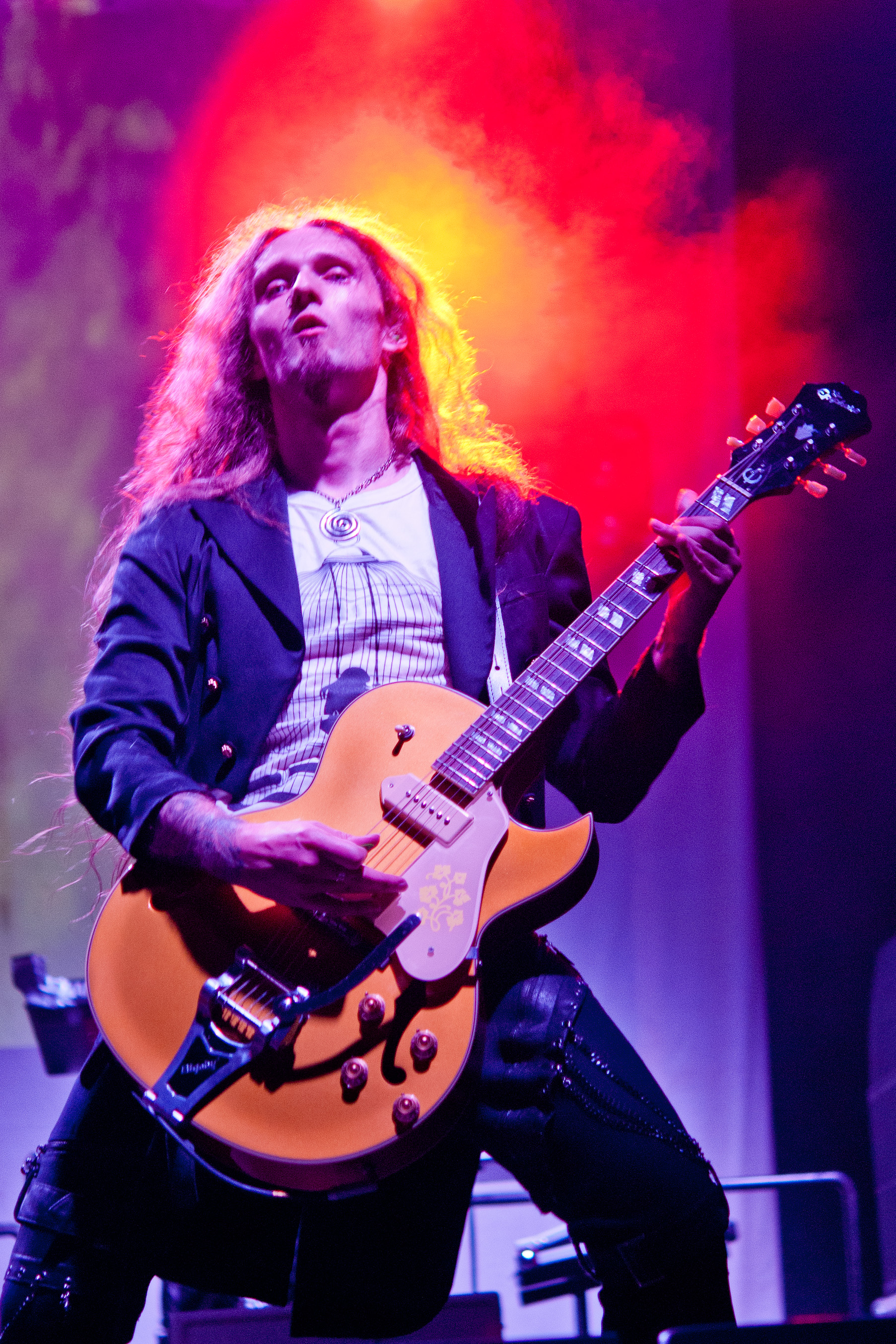

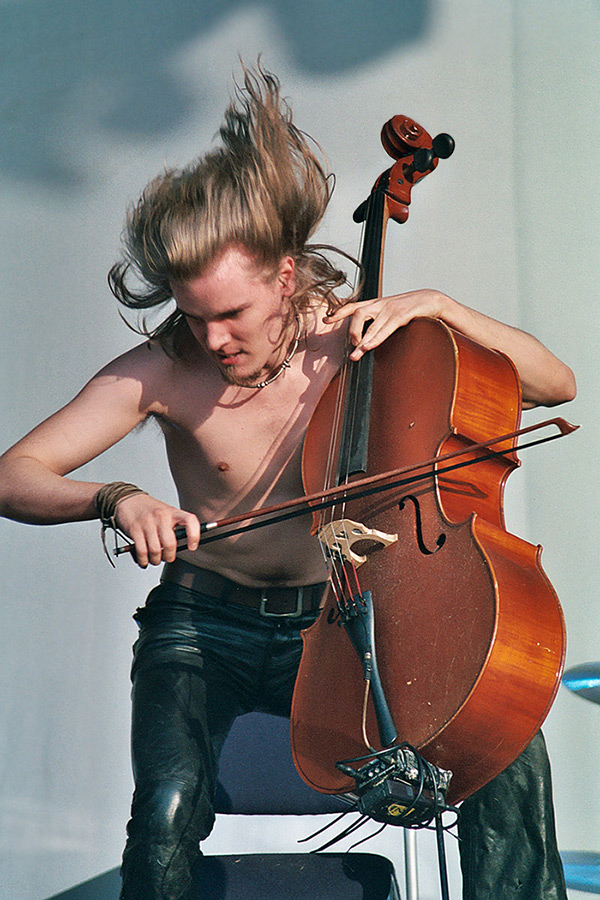
Apocalyptica

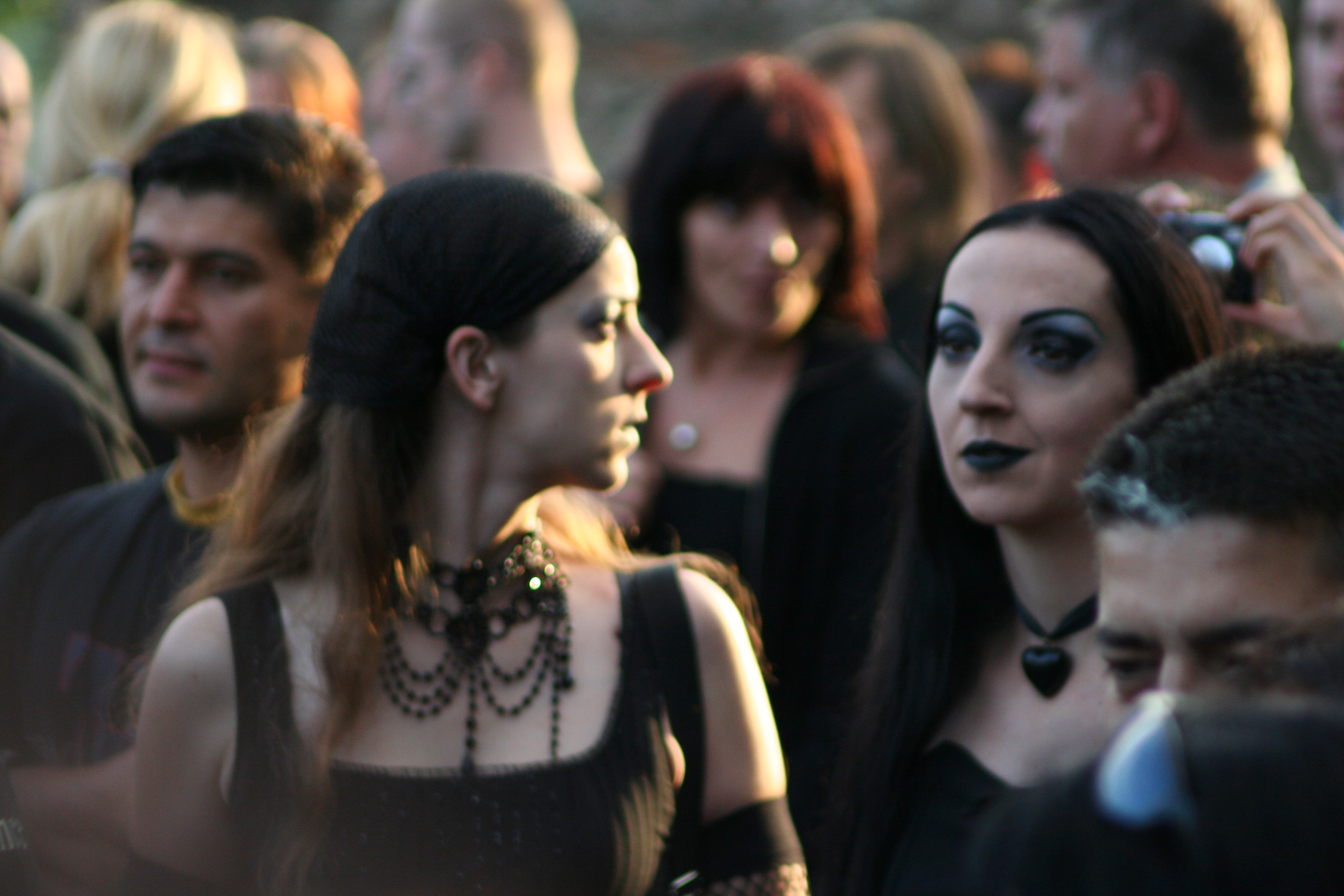
Castle Party 2007

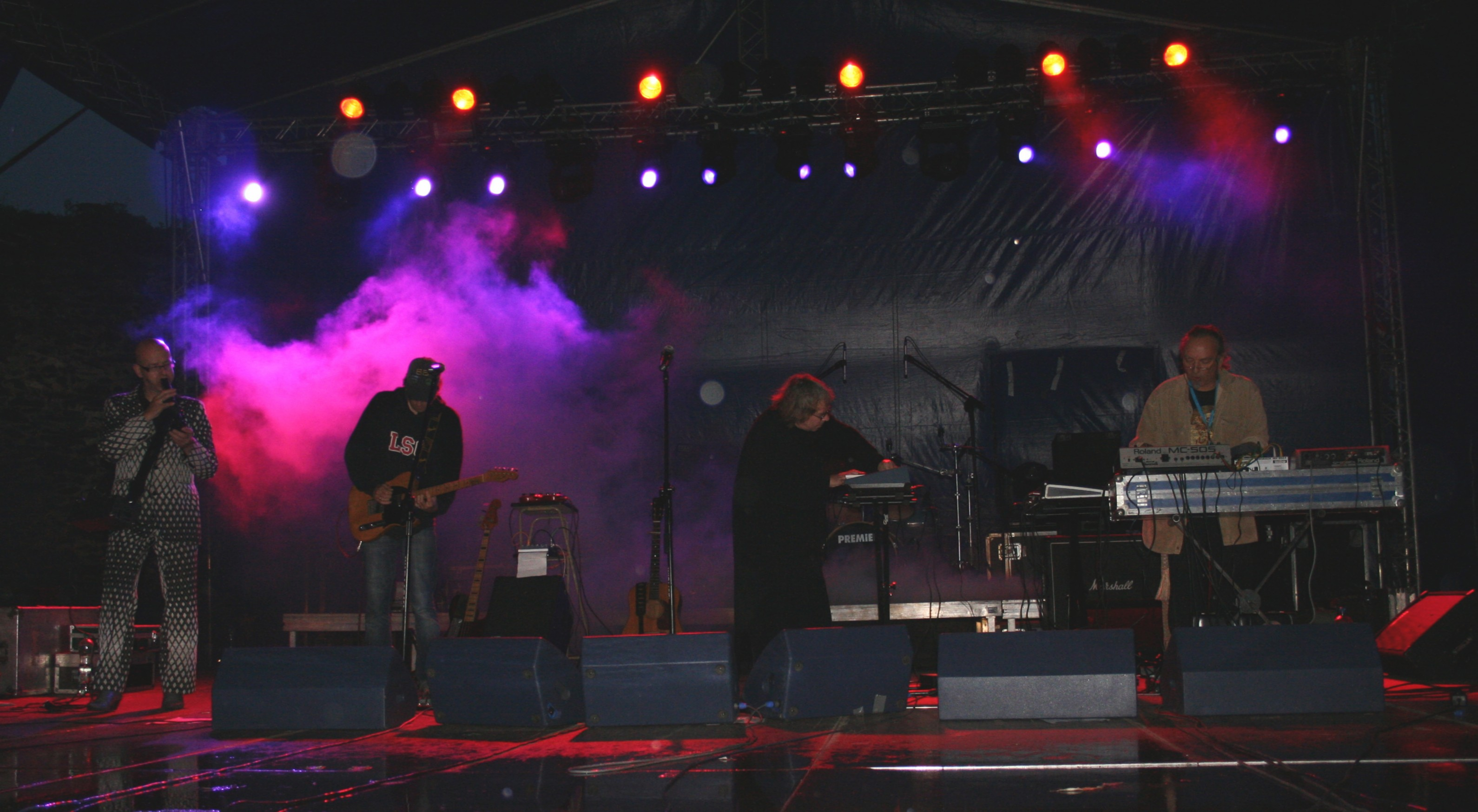
Castle Party 2007

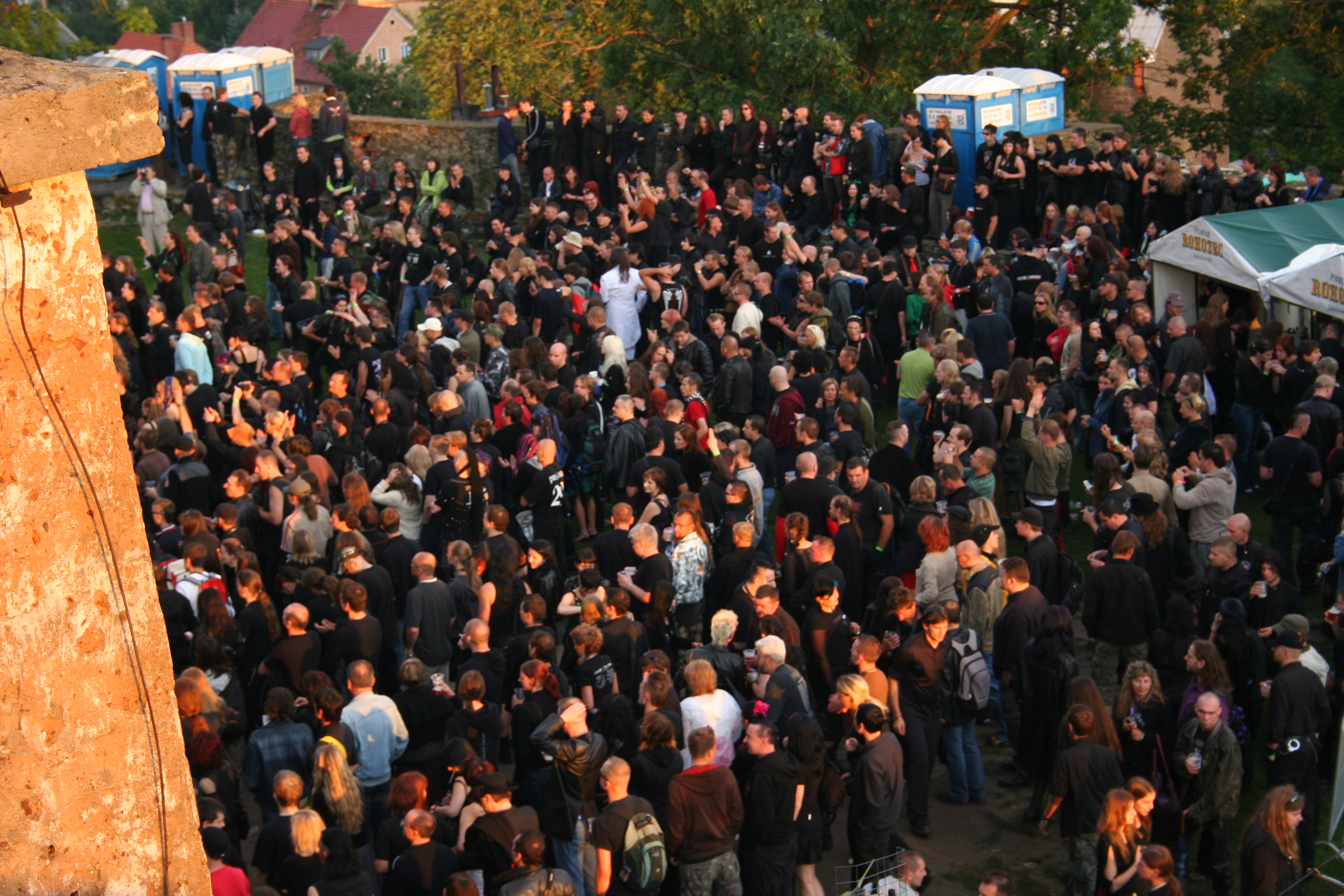

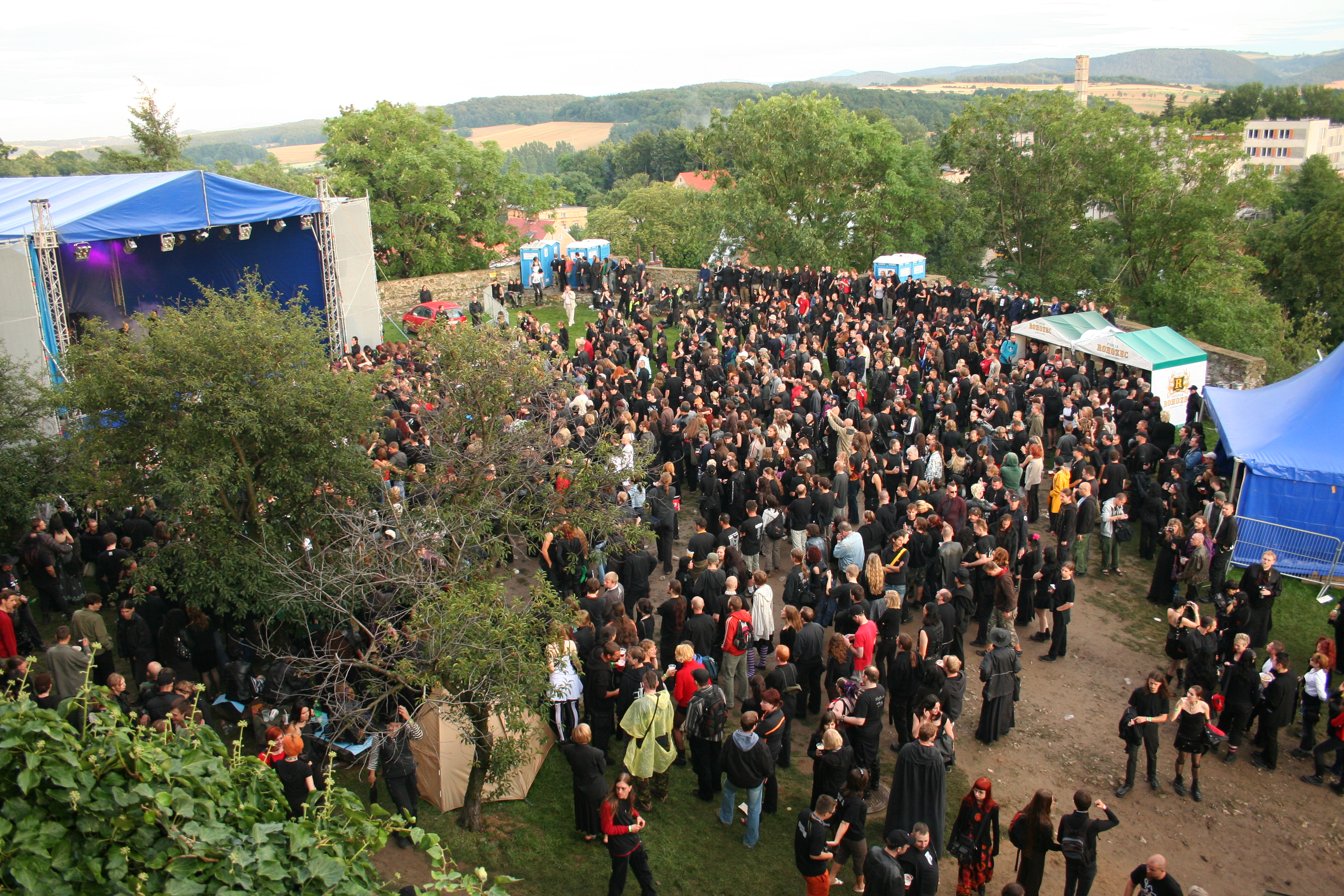

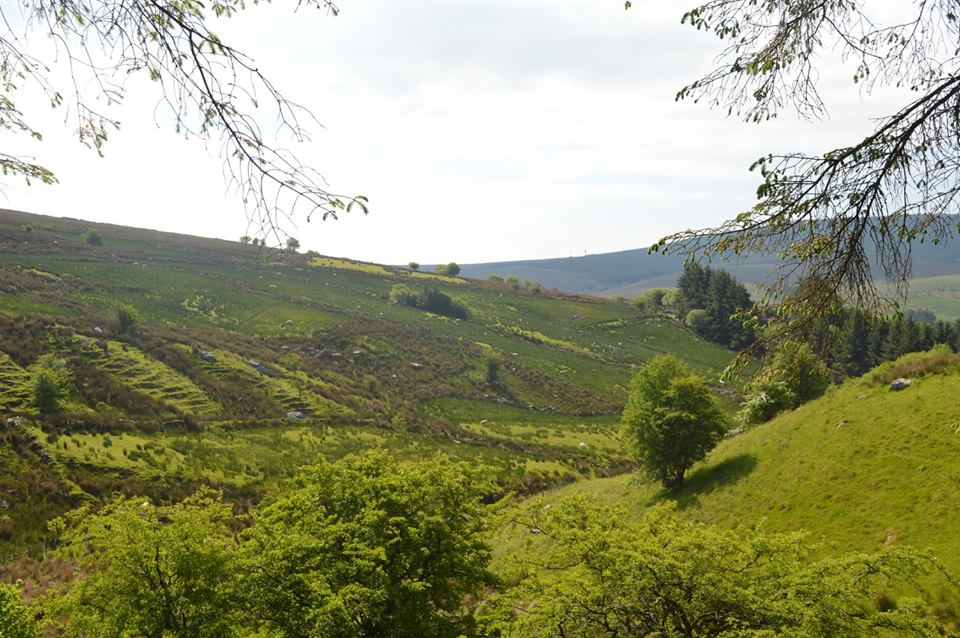
Location Species Festival, Leitrim, Ireland

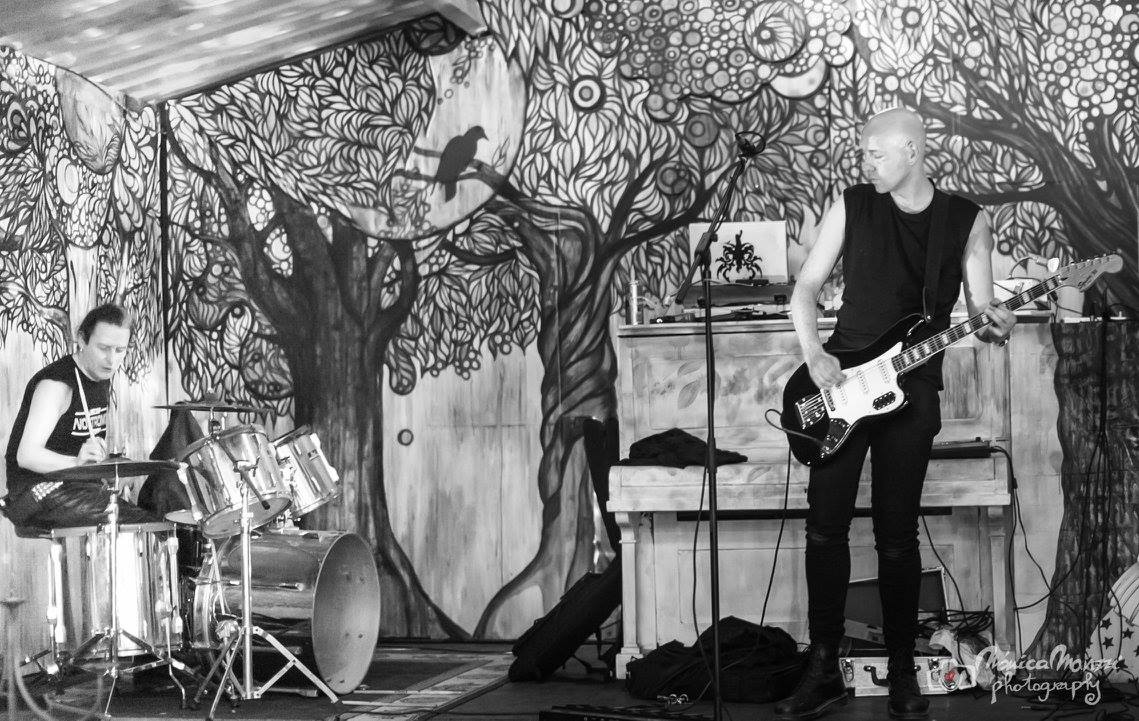
Control Freak at Species 2016, Ireland

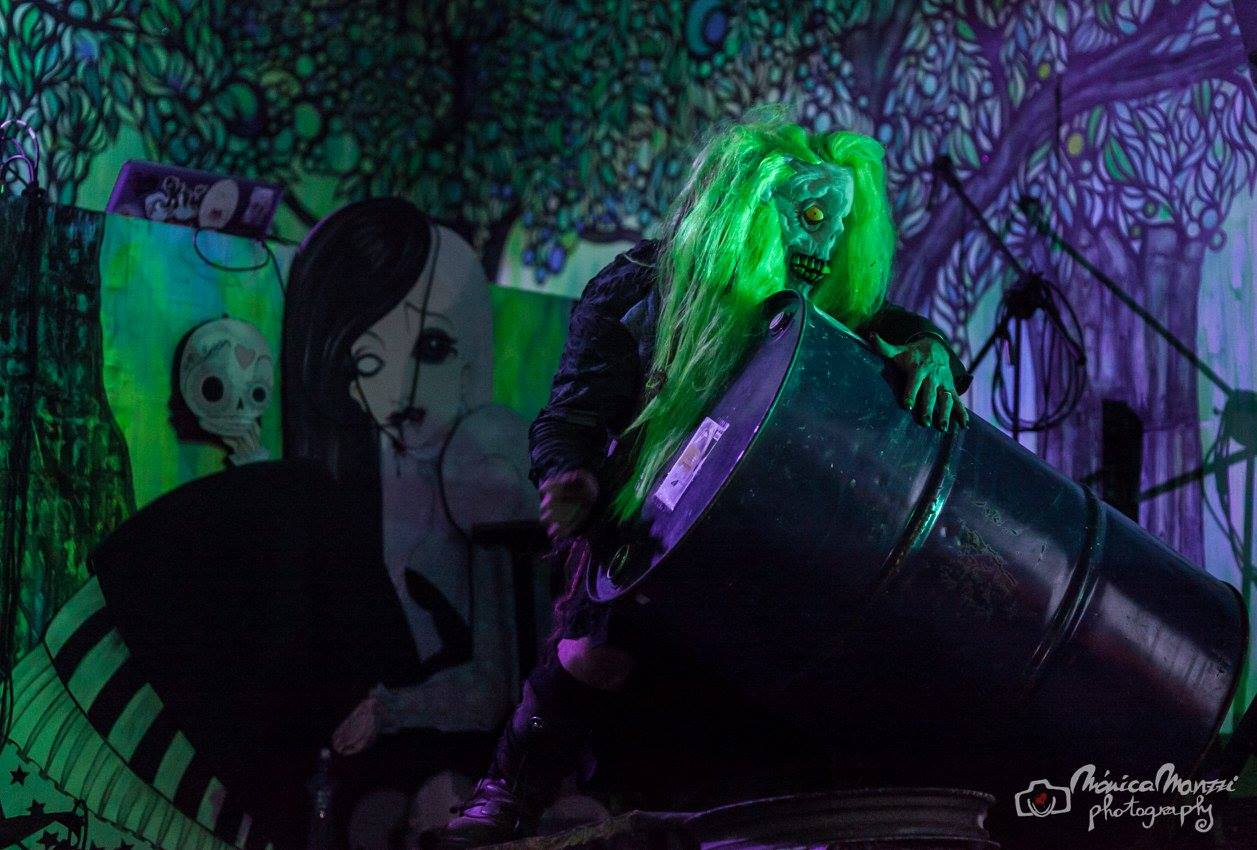
Kraven Brainz live at Species 2016, Leitrim, Ireland

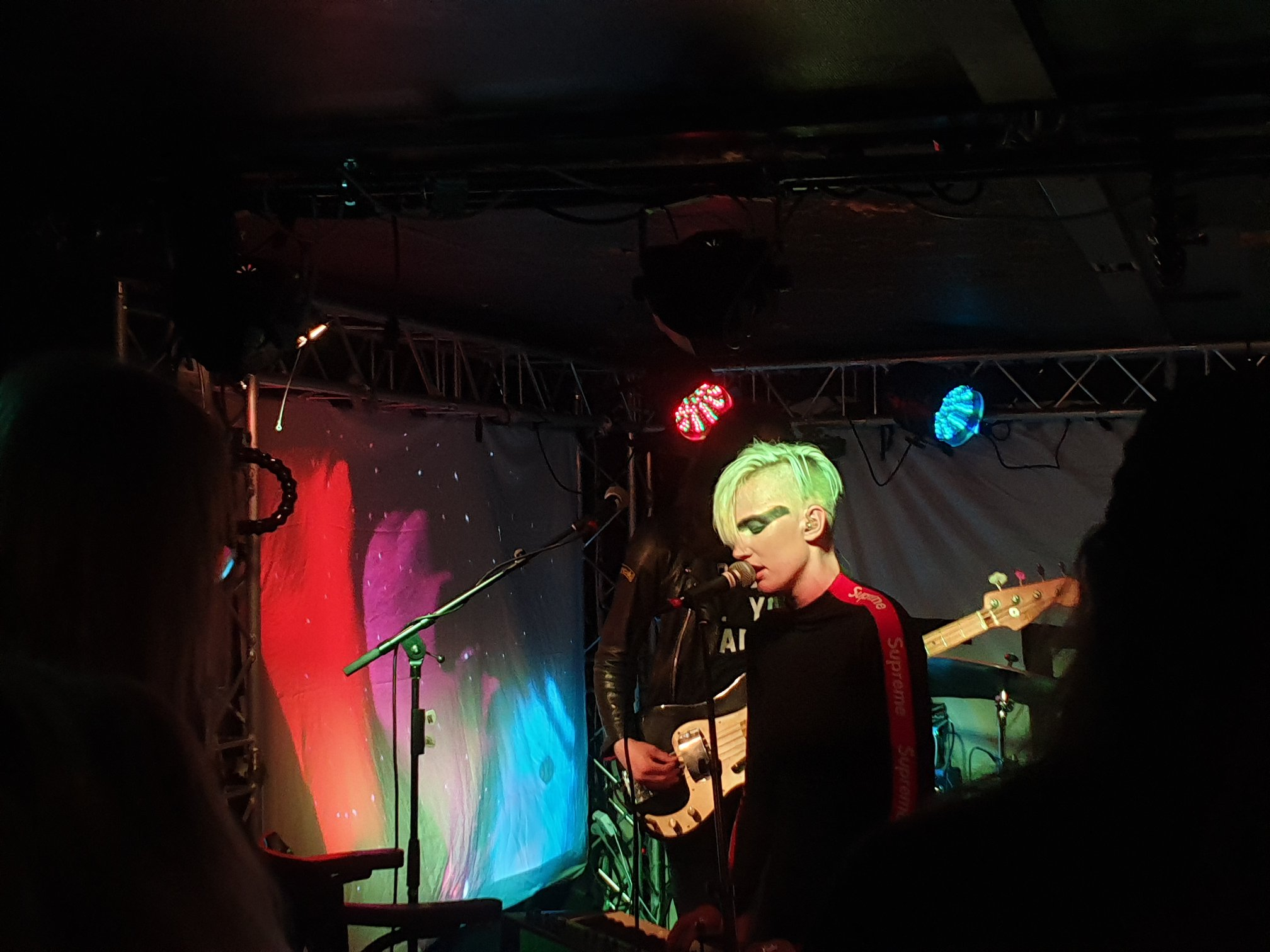
Felin, performing at Subkultfestivalen 2019

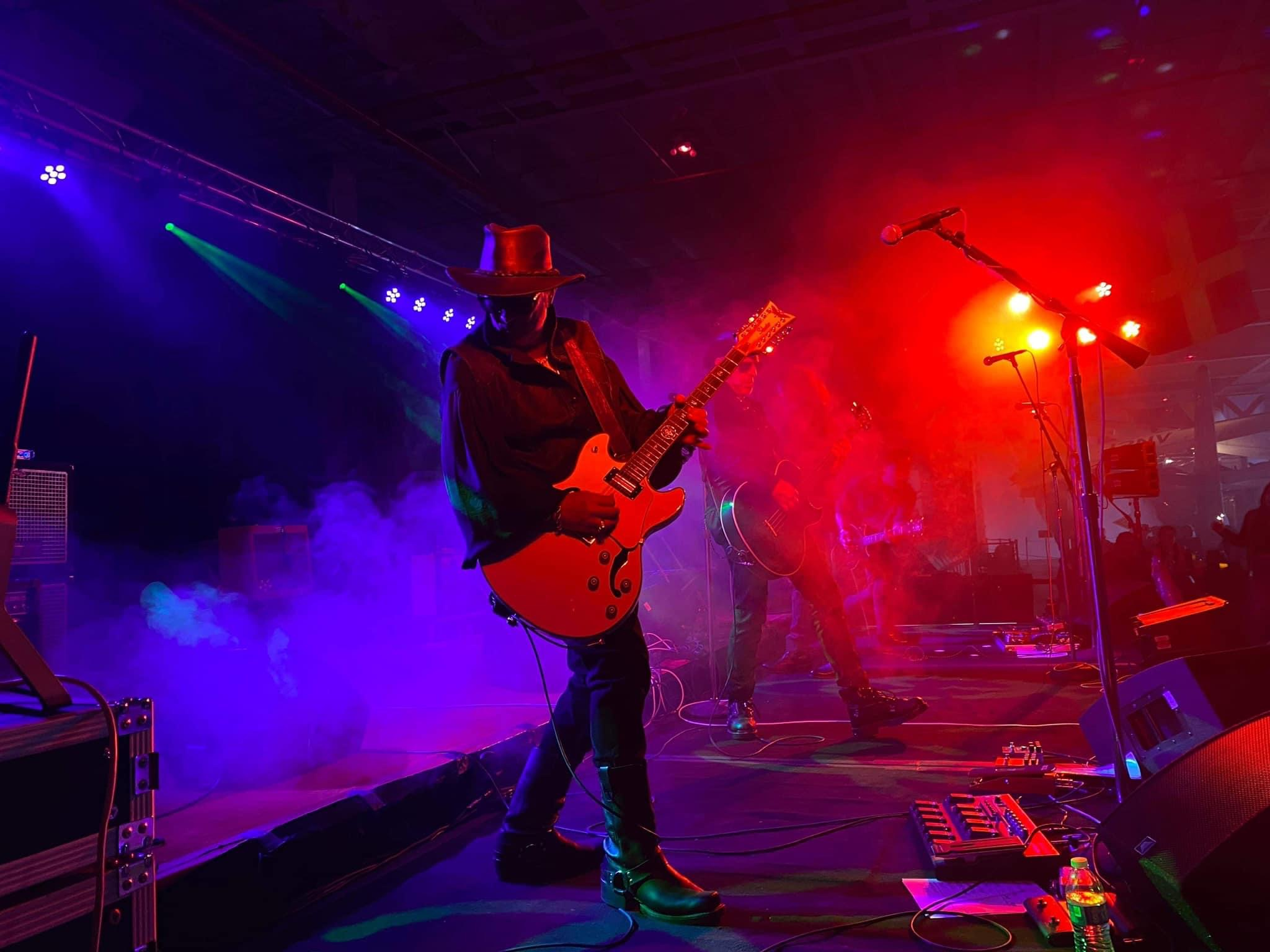
Michael Garcia of The Reptile House performing at The Menagerie's 2nd annual World Goth Festival on the USS Hornet. Alameda, CA 2022.

== See also ==
=== Related lists ===
- List of music festivals
- List of industrial music festivals
- List of punk rock festivals
- List of heavy metal festivals
- List of electronic dance music festivals

=== Related categories ===
- Goth festivals
- Rock festivals
- Punk rock festivals
- Electronic music festivals
- Heavy metal festivals
