= Steampunk World's Fair =

Former American steampunk festival

- Genre: Steampunk
- Venue: Radisson and Embassy Suites of Piscataway
- Location: Somerset or Piscataway, New Jersey
- Country: United States
- Inaugurated: 2010
- Most recent: 2017
- Attendance: c. 4,000 (in 2012)
- Organizer: Jeff Mach Events / Widdershins, Inc
- Website: steampunkworldsfair.com

Steampunk World's Fair (SPWF) was the largest annual steampunk festival on the East Coast of the United States and one of the biggest in the world held over the course of a weekend during the month of May in Piscataway, New Jersey or Somerset, New Jersey. The programming embodied an atmosphere of fandom, including musicians, performers, vendors, artisans, authors, and other guests whose work is related to the steampunk subculture.

== Activities ==
Activities at the convention typically included (but are not limited to):

- Panel Discussions - On a variety of subjects related to Steampunk, such as technology of the alternate histories, writing, publishing, the philosophical and sociological implications of the genre's works, costuming, etc.
- Speeches or other presentations.
- Socializing in common areas and at parties.
- Role-playing Gaming - A room for playing role-playing games (live-action and table), board games, and card games
- Performances of Steampunk music
- Costuming - both formal competition (the "Masquerade"), and casual "hall costumes"
- Fashion shows
- Theatrical productions
- H.P. Lovecraft-themed murder mystery dinners
- Political demonstrations linking contemporary and historical political issues
- Dealers' rooms selling books, movies, jewellery, costumes (often including weapons), games, comic books, etc.

== History, production, and promotion ==
The fair was founded in 2010 by Jeff Mach, Josh Marks, Erin Tierniegh, and Jack Manx.

Journalist Mo Rocca attended the 2011 Steampunk World's Fair and reviewed the event for CBS News Sunday Morning.

== Past events ==
- 2010 - The Steampunk World's Fair was first held May 14–16, 2010 at the Radisson Hotel, Piscataway, New Jersey. Nearly 3,000 people attended this first year.
- 2011 - The second annual SPWF was held May 20–22, 2011 at the Crowne Plaza Hotel, Somerset, New Jersey.
- 2012 - The third annual SPWF was held May 18–20 at the Embassy Suites and the Radisson Hotel in Piscataway, New Jersey. Attendance was over 4,000.

== Controversy ==
In January 2018, former volunteers, employees, and attendees of Steampunk World's Fair and other events organized by Jeff Mach Events (JME) accused JME founder Jeff Mach of sexual misconduct, questionable business practices, and failing to respond to alleged criminal activities at his events. On January 26, 2018, Jeff Mach announced on Facebook that he would be stepping down from running events and JME changed its name to Just Magical Events. A community run steampunk event took place on the 2018 event dates, with no association to the Steampunk World's Fair. It was called C.O.G.S., or Community Organized Gathering of Steampunks.

As of 2023, Just Magical Events has changed its name back to Jeff Mach Events and has listed The Evil Expo (The Steampunk World's Fair under a new name) and The Marvelous Maytide Misfit Market as events currently being organized by JME.
