= Vernian Process =

American neoclassical dark wave band

- Vernian Process performing at Steamstock in Richmond, CA, October 7, 2012.

Background information
- Origin: San Francisco, California, United States
- Genres: Neoclassical dark wave; dark wave; post-industrial
- Years active: 2003–present
- Members: Joshua Pfeiffer; Martín Irigoyen; Brian Figueroa; Vincent Van Veen; Steven Farrell
- Past members: Janus Zarate (2009-2014); Eugene Dyer III (2011-2013); Kyle Thomas (2010-2012); Heather Yager (2009-2011); Free Fargo (2009-2011); Ash Brodbeck (2009-2010); Vincent Ho (2009)
- Website: Official website

Vernian Process is an American neoclassical dark wave band formed in San Francisco in 2003. Taking its name from the works of 19th century author Jules Verne, Vernian Process is a band that creates music themed around Victorian scientific romance and its modern counterpart steampunk. Their sound is a fusion of modern and old-world styles. The band consists of vocalist Joshua A. Pfeiffer, and multi-instrumentalists Martín Irigoyen, Steven Farrell, and Vincent Van Veen.

== Career ==
Pfeiffer began working on music under the name Vernian Process in the winter of 2003. He released a number of downloadable albums over the next 4 years, including 2004's Discovery and 2006's The Forgotten Age, before being approached by Irigoyen about joining forces to work on Behold the Machine. From that point forward, Vernian Process evolved beyond a solo project. Throughout 2009, as work on the album progressed, Vernian Process sought out additional members in order to play shows to support the upcoming release of Behold the Machine, as well as record new material for future albums.

Behold the Machine was released on October 1, 2010.

On November 11, 2010, they announced that their next album would be titled The Consequences Of Time Travel.

On June 27, 2011, Vernian Process released the first single from the new album, entitled "Something Wicked (That Way Went)." The song was inspired by Ray Bradbury's similarly titled dark fantasy novel Something Wicked This Way Comes. The song integrates tarantella and circus music styles with progressive rock and features a sampled calliope. It features Kyle Thomas and Unwoman as guest musicians.

On October 31, 2011, they released a special remix of "Behold the Machine" entitled "Behold the Machine (Factory Floor Mix)." The remix incorporates EBM and industrial influences.

In October 2014, bassist Vincent Van Veen joined the project.

== Press ==
Vernian Process has appeared in articles in media such as the UK publication Bizarre Magazine, and MTV during their coverage of the Steampunk genre.

== Band members ==
- Joshua A. Pfeiffer - Vocals, songwriting
- Martín Irigoyen - Guitars, songwriting, various instruments, SFX
- Brian Figueroa - Guitars, keyboards
- Vincent Van Veen - Bass
- Steven Farrell - Keyboards, percussion

== Live appearances ==
Live, Vernian Process is often joined by cellist Erica Mulkey, aka Unwoman.

Vernian Process has appeared at events performing with Attrition, Skinny Puppy, Front Line Assembly, and Faith and the Muse, Ravenwood Festival in Arkansas, and the Eccentrik Music Festival in Chapel Hill, North Carolina in 2008. In 2009 they appeared at a number of festivals, notably Steamcon in Seattle, Washington, Eccentrik Festival in Chapel Hill, North Carolina, and The Endless Night Festival in New Orleans. In 2011, they performed across the West Coast at events such as Gaslight Gathering in San Diego, California; Maker Faire in San Mateo, California; and the Edwardian Ball in San Francisco, California. In 2012 they appeared alongside Thomas Dolby at the inaugural 'Steamstock' festival at the Craneway Pavilion in Richmond, California.

== Other projects ==
=== Shades of Violet ===
As of 2008, Joshua, Martin, and Allison Curval have begun working together on the musical score for the steampunk themed videogame; "Shades of Violet: Song of the Clockwork Princess" for Imagineer Games.

=== Dirigible Days ===
In 2012, Vernian Process was commissioned to write the theme song for the newly released steampunk web series Dirigible Days. The resulting instrumental track, "New Horizons", was released as a single on August 13, 2012.

The edited version for the show's opening also features narration by Anthony Daniels, most famous for his work as the voice of C-3PO in the Star Wars film series.

=== The Getty ===
In February 2014, The J. Paul Getty Museum in Los Angeles, California launched a video they created with Vernian Process to promote their Victorian photography exhibition. It shows a trip to The Getty as a time traveling experience.

=== Profondo Delle Tenebre ===
In mid-2014, frontman Joshua Pfeiffer formed Profondo Delle Tenebre, a synthwave/Italo-Disco project inspired by the Italian Giallo horror genre. He was soon joined by Half Rats of fellow Steampunk band Ague, and Vernian Process keyboardist Steven Farrell, as well as Vernian Process bandmate Martin Irigoyen. Operating under the pseudonyms Dario Bava, Mario Argento (after filmmakers Mario Bava and Dario Argento) and "The Shape", the first full-length album Esoterica was released in October 2015.

Profondo Delle Tenebre has also remixed tracks for San Francisco-based darkwave band Roadside Memorial and horror synth artist Nightcrawler.

== Discography ==
=== Albums ===
Discovery (2004)
No.	Title	Length
1.	"De la Terre à la Lune"	9:16
2.	"Empire Lost"	4:57
3.	"Cold"	4:20
4.	"Cirque de la mort"	4:46
5.	"Dusk Express"	3:59
6.	"Porcelain Crusaders"	6:24
7.	"Calm Before the Storm"	4:36
8.	"Echoes"	4:31
9.	"Ironworks"	4:23
10.	"Musashi"	3:58
11.	"Mirage"	4:44
12.	"At the Center of the Earth"	6:26
13.	"Grudge"	5:43
Total length:		68:05

The Forgotten Age (2006)
No.	Title	Length
1.	"Rust (Part 1)"
2.	"The Elegance of Espionage"
3.	"Revolt"
4.	"Benedictus"
5.	"Zeitgeist"
6.	"Rust (Part 2)"
7.	"Intermission"
8.	"Engelorum"
9.	"The Fading Rain"
10.	"Noir"
11.	"Where Are the Young Men?"
12.	"Atmosphere"
13.	"Switchback"
14.	"Reflection"
15.	"Rust (Part 3)"

Behold the Machine (2010)
No.	Title	Length
1.	"Behold the Machine"
2.	"The Alchemist's Vision"
3.	"Unhallowed Metropolis"
4.	"Interlude I: Into the Depths"
5.	"The Exile"
6.	"The Last Express"
7.	"Vagues de Vapeur"
8.	"Interlude II: Into the Shadows"
9.	"The Curse of Whitechapel"
10.	"The Maple Leaf Rag"
11.	"Queen of the Delta"
12.	"Into the Aether"
13.	"The Maiden Flight"

The Consequences of Time Travel (Part I - Clotho) (2019)
No.	Title	Length
1.	"Chronostasis (Overture)"
2.	"The Consequences of Time Travel (Part One)"
3.	"Fractured Memories"
4.	"In the Looking Glass"
5.	"Scarlett Twilight"
6.	"The Crimson Veil"
7.	"Jade Ruins"
8.	"Emerald Fields (featuring Jamie Brewster)"

- The Symphonic Collection (2007)
- The Cries of a Planet: A Tribute to Final Fantasy VII (2009)
- Sonic Symphony: An Orchestral Tribute to the Sega 16-Bit Games (2010)
- A Cursed Legacy: An Orchestral Tribute to the Music of Castlevania (2013)
- Beyond the End of Time: An Orchestral Tribute to Chrono Trigger (2013)
- Sonic Symphony: 25th Anniversary Remix (2016) (Credited to "Josh of Vernian Process")
- Castlevania: The Eternal Legacy (Vol. 1) 1986-1996 (2017)
- Sonic Symphony 2.0 (2018)
- The Consequences of Time Travel (TBA)

=== Singles ===
- Something Wicked (That Way Went) (2011)
- New Horizons (Dirigible Days Theme) (2012)
- ELEgy (2013)
- Fractured Memories (In the Looking Glass) (2016)
- La Solitude (2020)

=== EPs ===
- Steam Age Symphony (2003)
- Revolution (2005)

=== Compilations ===
- Catching Up With Vernian Process (2006)
- Catalysts (2006) - A Collection of cover versions
- Discovery of The Forgotten Age (2020) - A Collection of remastered early songs
- Before the Machine (2020) - A Collection of remastered early songs

== See also ==
- List of steampunk works: Steampunk musicians
