= List of steampunk works =

Steampunk is a subgenre of science fiction, fantasy and speculative fiction that came into prominence in the 1980s and early 1990s. The term denotes works set in an era or world wherein steam power is still widely used—usually the 19th century, and often set in Victorian era England—but with prominent elements of either science fiction or fantasy, such as fictional technological inventions like those found in the works of H. G. Wells and Jules Verne, or real technological developments like the computer occurring at an earlier date. Other examples of steampunk contain alternate history-style presentations of "the path not taken" of such technology as dirigibles or analog computers; these frequently are presented in an idealized light, or with a presumption of functionality.

Although many works now considered seminal to the genre were published in the 1960s and 1970s, the term "steampunk" originated in the late 1980s, as a tongue-in-cheek variant of cyberpunk.

This article is a list of works in the science fiction and fantasy genres considered by commentators to be steampunk.

== Precursors ==
Although the term "steampunk" was not coined until 1987, several works of fiction significant to the development of the genre were produced before that. For example, Mervyn Peake's novel Titus Alone (1959) anticipated many of the tropes of steampunk. Steampunk elements have also consistently appeared in mainstream manga since the 1940s, dating back to Osamu Tezuka's epic science-fiction trilogy consisting of Lost World (1948), Metropolis (1949) and Nextworld (1951).

Steampunk was particularly influenced by, and often adopts the style of the scientific romances and fantasies of the 19th century. Notably influential authors are:

- G. K. Chesterton
- Charles Dickens
- Arthur Conan Doyle
- George Griffith
- H. P. Lovecraft
- Albert Robida
- Mary Shelley
- Robert Louis Stevenson
- Bram Stoker
- Mark Twain
- Jules Verne
- H. G. Wells

Early adaptations of this scientific romance literature genre to film, particularly those from the 1950s and 1960s, are notable precursors of steampunk cinema:

- 20,000 Leagues Under the Sea (1954)
- From the Earth to the Moon (1958)
- Journey to the Center of the Earth (1959)
- The Time Machine (1960)
- Master of the World (1961)
- First Men in the Moon (1964)
- Captain Nemo and the Underwater City (1969)

== Comics and graphic novels ==
Year	Title	Creator(s)	Publisher	Note	Ref
1948	Lost World	Osamu Tezuka	Akita Shoten	Manga	
1949	Metropolis	Osamu Tezuka	Kodansha	Manga and anime film	
1951	Nextworld	Osamu Tezuka	Fuji Shobo	Manga and anime film	
1972	The Rose of Versailles	Riyoko Ikeda	Shueisha	Manga and anime	
1982	Nausicaä of the Valley of the Wind	Hayao Miyazaki	Tokuma Shoten	Manga and anime film	
1984	Nemesis the Warlock Book IV: The Gothic Empire	Pat Mills, Kevin O'Neill, Bryan Talbot	IPC Magazines Ltd		
1989	Gotham by Gaslight	Brian Augustyn, Mike Mignola, P. Craig Russell	DC Comics	Part of the Elseworlds	
1990	The Adventures of Luther Arkwright	Bryan Talbot	Valkyrie Press (1989), Dark Horse Comics (1990)	Nine part series	
1993	Sebastian O	Grant Morrison & Steve Yeowell	Vertigo		
1994	Steam Detectives	Kia Asamiya	Shueisha	Manga and anime	
1998	Cathedral Child	Lea Hernandez	Cyberosia	Part of the Texas Steampunk series	
1999	The League of Extraordinary Gentlemen	Alan Moore & Kevin O'Neill	America's Best		
2000	Steampunk	Joe Kelly & Chris Bachalo	Cliffhanger	Cancelled after 12 issues	
2001	Girl Genius	Phil Foglio & Kaja Foglio	Studio Foglio LLC		
2001	Fullmetal Alchemist	Hiromu Arakawa	Enix (2001–2003), Square Enix (2003–2010)	Manga and anime	
2002	Elemental Gelade	Mayumi Azuma	Mag Garden	Manga and anime	
2003	Gintama	Hideaki Sorachi	Shueisha	Manga and anime	
2004	D. Gray Man	Katsura Hoshino	Shueisha	Manga and anime	
2006	Iron West	Doug TenNapel	Image		
2009	Attack on Titan	Hajime Isayama	Kodansha	Manga and anime series	
2009	Grandville	Bryan Talbot	Jonathan Cape		
2010	Lady Mechanika	Joe Benitez	Aspen MLT		
2013	Clockwork Planet	Yuu Kamiya, Tsubaki Himana, Kuro	Kodansha		
2015	The Thrilling Adventures of Lovelace and Babbage	Sydney Padua	Penguin Books		

== Film and television ==
=== Films ===
Year	Title	Director(s)	Studio	Note	Ref
1958	The Fabulous World of Jules Verne	Karel Zeman			
1961	Master of the World	William Witney	American International Pictures		
1964	First Men in the Moon	Nathan Juran	Columbia Pictures		
1972	The Asphyx	Peter Newbrook			
1979	Time After Time	Nicholas Meyer	Orion Pictures		
1980	Fumoon	Osamu Tezuka	Tezuka Productions	Anime	
1981	The Mysterious Castle in the Carpathians	Oldřich Lipský			
1981	Time Bandits	Terry Gilliam	HandMade Films		
1984	Nausicaä of the Valley of the Wind	Hayao Miyazaki	Topcraft	Anime	
1985	The Adventures of Mark Twain	Will Vinton		Feature film	
1985	Brazil	Terry Gilliam	Embassy International Pictures	Feature film	
1986	The Great Mouse Detective		Disney		
1986	Laputa: Castle in the Sky	Hayao Miyazaki	Studio Ghibli	Anime	
1988	Young Einstein	Yahoo Serious		Comedy	
1992	Porco Rosso	Hayao Miyazaki	Studio Ghibli	Anime	
1994	The City of Lost Children	Jean-Pierre Jeunet, Marc Caro			
1994	Steam Trek: The Moving Picture	Dennis Sisterson	Ad Hoc Film Society	Star Trek fan film	
1995	Cannon Fodder				
1999	Wild Wild West	Barry Sonnenfeld	Warner Bros.		
2001	Metropolis	Katsuhiro Otomo, Rintaro	Madhouse	Anime	
2001	Sakura Wars: The Movie	Mitsuru Hongo, Oji Hiroi	Production I.G	Anime	
2001	Atlantis: The Lost Empire	Gary Trousdale, Kirk Wise	Walt Disney Pictures, Walt Disney Feature Animation	Animated	
2001	Vidocq				
2002	Treasure Planet	Ron Clements, John Musker	Walt Disney Pictures		
2002	Turn A Gundam	Yoshiyuki Tomino	Sunrise	Anime	
2003	The League of Extraordinary Gentlemen		20th Century Fox		
2004	Around the World in 80 Days	Frank Coraci	Walt Disney Pictures, Summit Entertainment, Walden Media		
2004	Howl's Moving Castle	Hayao Miyazaki	Studio Ghibli	Anime	
2004	Steamboy	Katsuhiro Otomo		Anime	
2004	Van Helsing		Universal Pictures		
2005	Fullmetal Alchemist the Movie: Conqueror of Shamballa	Seiji Mizushima, Shō Aikawa	Bones	Anime	
2005	The Mysterious Geographic Explorations of Jasper Morello			Short film	
2006	The Prestige		Touchstone Pictures		
2007	The Golden Compass		New Line Cinema		
2008	Mutant Chronicles	Philip Eisner	Isle of Man Film, Grosvenor Park		
2009	9	Shane Acker	Focus Features		
2010	Gulliver's Travels	Rob Letterman	Dune Entertainment, Davis Entertainment Company		
2011	Fullmetal Alchemist: The Sacred Star of Milos	Kazuya Murata	Bones	Anime	
2011	The Three Musketeers	Paul W. S. Anderson	Impact Pictures, Constantin Film, NEF Productions, New Legacy Film		
2014	Snowpiercer	Bong Joon-ho	Moho Film, Opus Pictures, Stillking Films	Feature film	
2015	Thelomeris	Balázs Hatvani			
2015	April and the Extraordinary World	Christian Desmares and Franck Ekinci		Anime	
2018	Mortal Engines	Christian Rivers	Universal Pictures, Media Rights Capital, WingNut Films	Feature film	

=== Television ===
Year	Title	Creator(s)	Studio	Note	Ref
1965	The Wild Wild West	Michael Garrison		CBS series	
1974	Space Battleship Yamato	Leiji Matsumoto, Eiichi Yamamoto	Group TAC	Anime, Yomiuri TV series	
1978	Future Boy Conan	Hayao Miyazaki, Sōji Yoshikawa	Nippon Animation	Anime, NHK series	
1979	The Rose of Versailles	Tadao Nagahama, Osamu Dezaki, Riyoko Ikeda	TMS Entertainment	Anime, Nippon TV series	
1982	Q.E.D.	John Hawkesworth		CBS series	
1982	Voyagers!	James D. Parriott	James D. Parriott Productions	NBC series	
1990	Nadia: The Secret of Blue Water	Hideaki Anno, Hayao Miyazaki, Shinji Higuchi	Gainax	Anime, NHK series	
1993	The Adventures of Brisco County, Jr.	Jeffrey Boam and Carlton Cuse	Boam/Cuse Productions	Fox Broadcasting Company series	
1995	Legend	Michael Piller and Bill Dial	Gekko Film Corp / Bill & Mike Productions	Paramount Television series	
1998	Steam Detectives	Nobuyoshi Habara, Kia Asamiya	Xebec	Anime, TV Tokyo series	
1999	Turn A Gundam	Yoshiyuki Tomino, Hajime Yatate	Sunrise	Anime, Fuji Television series	
2000	Sakura Wars	Ryūtarō Nakamura, Satoru Akahori	Madhouse	Anime, Tokyo Broadcasting System (TBS) series	
2000	The Secret Adventures of Jules Verne	Gavin Scott	Filmline International	Sci Fi series	
2003	Fullmetal Alchemist	Seiji Mizushima, Shō Aikawa, Hiromu Arakawa	Bones	Anime, Japan News Network (JNN) series	
2003	Last Exile	Koichi Chigira	Gonzo	Anime, TV Tokyo series	
2005	Elemental Gelade	Shigeru Ueda, Naruhisa Arakawa, Mayumi Azuma	Xebec (Sunrise Beyond)	Anime, TV Tokyo series	
2006	D. Gray Man	Reiko Yoshida, Katsura Hoshino	TMS Entertainment	Anime, TV Tokyo series	
2006	The Amazing Screw-On Head	Chris Prynoski, Bryan Fuller, Mike Mignola	Syfy Digital	Animated, Syfy pilot (1 episode)	
2008	Murdoch Mysteries	Maureen Jennings, Cal Coons, Alexandra Zarowny	Shaftesbury Films	Citytv; 2011- CBC	
2008	Sanctuary	Damian Kindler	Syfy Digital	Web series	
2009	Fullmetal Alchemist: Brotherhood	Yasuhiro Irie, Hiroshi Ōnogi, Hiromu Arakawa	Bones	Anime, Japan News Network (JNN) series	
2009	Riese: Kingdom Falling	Ryan Copple, Kaleena Kiff	Syfy Digital	Web series	
2011	Mantecoza	Susan Kaff, Kevin R. Phipps		Web series	
2011	Warehouse 13	Jack Kenny, David Simkins	Syfy	Syfy series	
2012	The Legend of Korra	Michael Dante DiMartino, Bryan Konietzko	Nickelodeon	Animated, Nickelodeon series	
2012	Green Lantern: The Animated Series ("Steam Lantern")	Ernie Altbacker, Rick Morales	Cartoon Network	Cartoon Network series	
2013	The World of Steam	Matthew Yang King		Web series, initially funded on Kickstarter	
2014	Phineas and Ferb ("Steampunx")	Dan Povenmire, Jeff "Swampy" Marsh	Disney Television Animation	Disney Channel series	
2016	Kabaneri of the Iron Fortress	Tetsurō Araki, Ichirō Ōkouchi	Wit Studio (IG Port)	Anime, Fuji TV (Noitamina) series	
2017	Princess Principal	Masaki Tachibana, Ichirō Ōkouchi	Studio 3Hz, Actas		
2019	Carnival Row	René Echevarria, Travis Beacham	Siesta Productions, Legendary Television, Amazon Studios	Amazon Studios	
2019	His Dark Materials	Jack Thorne	BBC Studios, Bad Wolf, New Line Cinema	BBC Studios, HBO	

== Websites ==
Year	Title	URL	Note
2002	Steam Trek	https://www.steam-trek.com	Explore Steam Trek's rich Victorian steampunk universe of ships, crews, alien worlds, and adventures across the aether and the Steam Trek universe featuring tales of the Royal Aether Fleet's ship, the HMS Dauntless.
2025	Airovale	https://airovale.com	Airovale is a multimedia steampunk fantasy featuring book and video episodes, following zeppelin crews navigating a Southern Sea archipelago, where fae guardians protect ancient secrets and human ambition collides with mystical forces.

== Games ==
=== Role-playing games ===
- Airship Pirates (2011)
- Castle Falkenstein (1994) by Mike Pondsmith
- Forgotten Futures (1993) by Marcus L. Rowland
- GURPS Steampunk (2000)
- Iron Kingdoms (2004)
- Kerberos Club for Wild Talents (2009), Savage Worlds (2010), and Fate (2011)
- Space: 1889 (1988)
- Tephra: The Steampunk RPG (2012)

=== Video games ===
- The Eidolon (1985)
- Final Fantasy series (1987–present)
  - Final Fantasy (1987)
  - Final Fantasy IV (1991)
  - Final Fantasy VI (1994)
  - Final Fantasy IX (2000)
- Ultima: Worlds of Adventure 2: Martian Dreams (1991)
- Steel Empire (1992)
- The Chaos Engine (1993)
- Myst series (1993–2005)
- Wild Guns (1994)
- Sakura Wars series (1996–present)
- Wild Arms (1997)
- Jeff Wayne's The War of the Worlds (1998)
- Thief series (1998–2014)
- Pro Pinball: Fantastic Journey (1999)
- Elemental Gimmick Gear (1999)
- Skies of Arcadia (2000), Victorian fantasy setting, where the main form of transportation is airships
- Arcanum: Of Steamworks and Magick Obscura (2001)
- Progear (2001)
- Syberia series (2002–2022)
- Darkwatch (2005)
- Bang! Howdy (2006)
- Rise of Nations: Rise of Legends (2006)
- Steambot Chronicles (2006)
- On the Rain-Slick Precipice of Darkness (2007–2013)
- Professor Layton (2007–2011)
- Nostalgia (2008)
- Shikkoku no Sharnoth: What a Beautiful Tomorrow (2008)
- Damnation (2009)
- Neo Steam: The Shattered Continent (2009)
- Guns of Icarus (2009)
  - Guns of Icarus Online (2012)
- Greed Corp (2010)
- Resonance of Fate (2010)
- Gatling Gears (2011)
- Vessel (2012)
- Dishonored (2012)
  - Dishonored 2 (2016)
  - Dishonored: Death of the Outsider (2017)
- BioShock Infinite (2013)
- SteamWorld Dig (2013)
- The Incredible Adventures of Van Helsing (2013)
- Styx: Master of Shadows (2014)
- The Order: 1886 (2014)
- Subterfuge (2015)
- Airships: Conquer the Skies (2015)
  - Airships: Lost Flotilla (2025)
- Code Name: S.T.E.A.M. (2015)
- SteamWorld Heist (2016)
- Viktor, a Steampunk Adventure (2017)
- Frostpunk (2018)
- Sovereign Syndicate (2024)

== Literature ==
Year	Title	Author(s)	First publisher	Note	Ref
1967	Queen Victoria's Bomb	Ronald W. Clark	Jonathan Cape		
1971	Warlord of the Air	Michael Moorcock		A Nomad of the Time Streams book 1	
1974	The Land Leviathan	Michael Moorcock		A Nomad of the Time Streams book 2	
1979	Morlock Night	K. W. Jeter			
1981	The Steel Tsar	Michael Moorcock	Granada	A Nomad of the Time Streams book 3	
1983	The Anubis Gates	Tim Powers	Ace Books		
1983	Kelly Country	Bertram Chandler	Penguin Books		
1987	Infernal Devices	K. W. Jeter	St. Martin's Press|		
1990	The Difference Engine	William Gibson & Bruce Sterling	Gollancz		
1992	Anno Dracula	Kim Newman	Simon & Schuster	Anno Dracula series book 1. World Fantasy Award nominee	
1992	Lord Kelvin's Machine	James Blaylock	Arkham House		
1993	Anti-Ice	Stephen Baxter	Ace Books		
1994	For the Crown and the Dragon	Stephen Hunt	Green Nebula		
1994	Pasquale's Angel	Paul J. McAuley			
1995	Northern Lights (The Golden Compass)	Philip Pullman		His Dark Materials book 1	
1995	The Steampunk Trilogy	Paul Di Filippo		Collection of 3 stories	
2000	Perdido Street Station	China Miéville	Macmillan	A Bas-Lag novel	
2001	Mortal Engines Quartet	Philip Reeve	Scholastic		
2001	The Peshawar Lancers	S.M. Stirling	Tor		
2001	Zeppelins West	Joe R. Lansdale		"Ned the Seal" trilogy book 1	
2003	The Light Ages	Ian R. MacLeod	Ace Books	"The Light Years" book 1	
2004	Fitzpatrick's War	Theodore Judson	DAW Books		
2004	Airborn	Kenneth Oppel	HarperCollins	First in series	
2006	Flaming London	Joe R. Lansdale		"Ned the Seal" trilogy book 2	
2007	Mainspring	Jay Lake	Tor Books		
2006	The Glass Books of the Dream Eaters	Gordon Dahlquist	Bantam Press		
2007	The Court of the Air	Stephen Hunt	HarperCollins	Jackelian series book 1	
2007	Pax Britannia	Jonathan Green	Abaddon Books		
2007	Wicked Gentlemen	Ginn Hale	Blind Eye Books	Gaylactic Spectrum Award winner.	
2008	The Affinity Bridge	George Mann	Snowbooks		
2008	Steampunk	Ann VanderMeer & Jeff VanderMeer	Tachyon Publications	Anthology	
2008	Clockwork Heart	Dru Pagliassotti	Juno Books	RT Book Reviewers' Choice Award 2008: Best Small Press Contemporary Paranormal / Futuristic Novel	
2008	The Kingdom Beyond the Waves	Stephen Hunt	HarperCollins	Jackelian series book 2	
2008	Extraordinary Engines	Nick Gevers	Solaris	Anthology	
2009	The Black Lung Captain	Chris Wooding	Spectra	Tales of the Ketty Jay 2	
2009	The Iron Jackal	Chris Wooding	Gollancz	Tales of the Ketty Jay 3	
2009	Soulless	Gail Carriger	Orbit Books	first novel of the Parasol Protectorate series	
2009	Worldshaker	Richard Harland	Allen and Unwin (Aus) Simon & Schuster (US)	First in series, Tam-Tam Je Bouquine Award 2011, Inky Award 2009	
2009	Leviathan	Scott Westerfeld	Simon Pulse	First in a New Series	
2009	Boneshaker	Cherie Priest	Tor	First installment in the Clockwork Century Series	
2009	The Rise of the Iron Moon	Stephen Hunt	HarperCollins	Jackelian series book 3	
2010	The Iron Duke	Meljean Brook	Berkley Trade	The first in the Iron Seas series	
2010	Behemoth	Scott Westerfeld	Simon Pulse	2nd book in the Leviathan series	
2010	Dreadnought	Cherie Priest	Tor	Second installment in the Clockwork Century Series	
2010	The Dream of Perpetual Motion	Dexter Palmer	Picador		
2010	The Infernal Devices (series)	Cassandra Clare	Walker Books		
2010	Steampunk II: Steampunk Reloaded	Ann VanderMeer & Jeff VanderMeer	Tachyon Publications	Anthology	
2010	The Bookman	Lavie Tidhar	Angry Robot	The Bookman Histories series book 1	
2010	Secrets of the Fire Sea	Stephen Hunt	HarperCollins	Jackelian series book 4	
2010	The Strange Affair of Spring-Heeled Jack	Mark Hodder	Pyr	Burton & Swinburne series book 1. Winner of the 2010 Philip K. Dick Award	
2010	Aurorarama	Jean-Christophe Valtat	Melville House Publishing	The Mysteries of New-Venice, I	
2011	Chasing Schroedinger's Cat	Tom Hourie	Iron Ring Communications		
2011	Phoenix Rising: A Ministry of Peculiar Occurrences Novel	Philippa Ballantine & Tee Morris	HarperCollins Publishers	The Ministry of Peculiar Occurrences book 1	
2011	Retribution Falls	Chris Wooding	Gollancz	Tales of the Ketty Jay 1	
2011	Hard Magic	Larry Correia	Baen Books	The Grimnoir Chronicles Series Book 1	
2011	Spellbound	Larry Correia	Baen Books	The Grimnoir Chronicles Series Book 2	
2011	The Manual of Detection	Jedediah Berry	Heinemann		
2011	Camera Obscura	Lavie Tidhar	Angry Robot	The Bookman Histories series book 2	
2011	Jack Cloudie	Stephen Hunt	HarperCollins	Jackelian series book 5	
2011	Modern Marvels - Viktoriana	Wayne Reinagel	Knightraven Studios	First book of the Modern Marvels Trilogy	
2011	Liberator	Richard Harland	Allen and Unwin (Aus)	Second in series	
2011	Across the Stonewind Sky	Ged Maybury	Jaffa Books	Into the Storm's Domain book 1	
2011	The Wrath of Fate	Robert Brown	Three Ravens	Book One of the Airship Pirate Chronicles	
2012	From the Deep of the Dark	Stephen Hunt	HarperCollins	Jackelian series book 6	
2012	The Janus Affair: A Ministry of Peculiar Occurrences Novel	Philippa Ballantine & Tee Morris	HarperCollins Publishers	The Ministry of Peculiar Occurrences book 2	
2012	The Great Game	Lavie Tidhar	Angry Robot	The Bookman Histories series book 3	
2012	Steampunk III: Steampunk Revolution	Ann VanderMeer	Tachyon Publications	Anthology	
2012	The Mammoth Book of Steampunk	Sean Wallace	Constable & Robinson / Running Press	Anthology	
2012	Resurrection Engines: 15 Extraordinary Tales of Scientific Romance	Scott Harrison	Snowbooks	Anthology	
2012	Ether Frolics	Paul Marlowe	Sybertooth	Short story collection.	
2013	The Aylesford Skull	James Blaylock	Titan	A Langdon St. Ives novel.	
2013	Warbound	Larry Correia	Baen Books	The Grimnoir Chronicles Series Book 3	
2013	The Wake of the Dragon	Jaq D Hawkins	Golbin Publishing	Airship Mechanoids series	
2013	Clockwork Planet	Yuu Kamiya, Tsubaki Himana	Kodansha	Light novel series	
2013	Hour of the Wolf	Andrius Tapinas	Andrius Tapinas	Steam and Stone Saga Book 1	
2013	Luminous Chaos	Jean-Christophe Valtat	Melville House Publishing	The Mysteries of New-Venice, II	
2013	A Steampunk Guide to Tea Dueling	Khurt Khave	Dangerous Worlds	Steampunk Game Guide	
2014	The Adventures of Alan Shaw	Craig Hallam	Inspired Quill	The Adventures of Alan Shaw book 1	
2014	Chainsaw Alice in Wonderland	Khurt Khave	Dangerous Worlds	Steampunk Horror	
2014	The Great Abraham Lincoln Pocket Watch Conspiracy	Jacopo della Quercia	St. Martin's Griffin	Steampunk / Historical Fiction	
2015	The Aeronaut's Windlass	Jim Butcher	Penguin Group	Steampunk, Magic, Fantasy	
2018	Old Haunts	Craig Hallam	Inspired Quill	The Adventures of Alan Shaw book 2	
2018	Watch City: Waltham Watch	Jessica Lucci	Indie Woods	Steampunk, First in a new series	
2019	Sigimmortal	Tom Waguespack	Alban Lake Publishing	Steampunk, First in a new series	
2023	The Engineer's Apprentice	J. R. Martin	Underdog Press	Steampunk, First in series, Magic, Fantasy	
2026	The Diver and the Light	Isambard Adlington	Independently published	Steampunk, First in series, Science, Fantasy, Humour	
2026	The #1 Best Cellar	Isambard Adlington	Independently published	Steampunk, sequel, Science, Fantasy, Humour	

== Music ==
=== Steampunk musicians ===
The following is a list of musicians and bands that have either adopted a steampunk aesthetic in their appearance, or have a decidedly steampunk approach to their music.

- Abney Park
- Darcy James Argue's Secret Society
- Doctor Steel
- The Clockwork Dolls
- Clockwork Quartet
- The Cog Is Dead
- Frenchy and the Punk
- H.U.M.A.N.W.I.N.E.
- The Men That Will Not Be Blamed for Nothing
- The Mechanisms
- Professor Elemental
- Rasputina
- Steam Powered Giraffe
- Sunday Driver
- Thomas Truax
- Unextraordinary Gentlemen
- Vagabond Opera
- Vernian Process
- Veronique Chevalier

=== Other bands with steampunk-themed works ===
While not strictly steampunk in their general appearance or approach to music, several musicians and bands have produced music, music videos or concept albums that directly appeal to the steampunk aesthetic. Included in these are:

- AC/DC - "Rock 'n' Roll Train" (video, stage production)
- Justin Bieber - "Santa Claus Is Comin' to Town" (Arthur Christmas Version) (video)
- Gandalf's Fist - The Clockwork Fable (album)
- David Guetta feat. Nicki Minaj - "Turn Me On" (video)
- John Hartford - Steam Powered Aereo-Takes (album)
- Hatsune Miku - MIKU EXPO 2026 EUROPE (concert tour theme and main visual artwork)
- Lovett - "Eye of the Storm" (video)
- Mushroomhead - Qwerty (video)
- Gary Numan - Splinter (Songs from a Broken Mind) (album)
- Panic! At The Disco - "The Ballad of Mona Lisa" (video)
- Rush - Clockwork Angels (album and Time Machine tour)
- Smashing Pumpkins - "Tonight, Tonight" (video)
- Lindsey Stirling - "Roundtable Rival" (video)
- Tom Waits - Blood Money (album)
- Therion - "Adulruna Rediviva" (video)
- Thomas Dolby - "She Blinded Me with Science" (video)

== Performance art ==
- Airship Isabella
- League of S.T.E.A.M. (Supernatural and Troublesome Ectoplasmic Apparition Management), a.k.a. the "Steampunk Ghostbusters", a performance art troupe from Southern California popular in the steampunk community and specializing in live interactive themed entertainment
- Penny Dreadful Productions
- The Cirque du Soleil touring show Kurios

== See also ==
- Cyberpunk
- Dieselpunk
- List of cyberpunk works
- Retro-futurism
- Science fiction Western

== Notes ==
160. ^Sadie Forsyth (October 27, 2012) http://sadieforsythe.com/wp/review-of-jaq-d-hawkins-the-wake-of-the-dragon/
