= Stealth =

Stealth may refer to:

== Military ==
- Stealth technology, technology used to conceal ships, aircraft, and missiles
  - Stealth aircraft, aircraft which use stealth technology
  - Stealth ground vehicle, ground vehicles which use stealth technology
  - Stealth patrol unit, used by police forces in the United States and Canada
  - Stealth ship, ships which use stealth technology

== Media ==
=== Books ===
- Stealth Magazine, an independent hip-hop magazine from Australia
- The Stealth (novel), a novel by Sonallah Ibrahim

=== Film and television ===
- Stealth (film), a 2005 action/adventure thriller
- The Stealth (film), a 2008 3D-animated short film
- "Stealth" (The Americans), a 2014 television episode
- "Stealth" (Bugs), a 1995 television episode

=== Music ===
- Stealth (rapper), Albanian rapper
- Stealth (album), a 2007 release by the band Scorn
- Stealth Records, an independent record label specializing in electronic dance music
- "Stealth", a song by Way Out West from Intensify
- Stealth, a model of B.C. Rich guitar

=== Video games ===
- Stealth game, a genre of video games
- Stealth (1984 video game), a rail shooter game published by Broderbund
- Stealth (1992 video game), a Japan-exclusive game released for the Super Famicom

== Sports ==
- Houston Stealth, a team in the National Women's Basketball League, active 2002–2004
- Wichita Stealth, an arena football team, active 1999–2004
- San Jose Stealth, a team in the National Lacrosse League, active 2004–2009
- Washington Stealth, a team in the National Lacrosse League, active 2009–2013
- Vancouver Stealth, a team in the National Lacrosse League, founded 2013

== Technology ==
- Mitsubishi GTO also known as the Dodge Stealth, a sports car
- Nighthawk (roller coaster), an America roller coaster formerly known as STEALTH
- Stealth (roller coaster), at Thorpe Park in the United Kingdom
- Airrow A-8S Stealth, a pneumatic air rifle

== Other uses ==
- Crypsis, the ability of an animal or plant to avoid observation or detection by other animals
- Stealth mode, secretive business behavior
  - Stealth tax, a new tax that is collected in a way that is not obvious
- Stealth (transgender), passing unseen as one's desired gender in the public sphere
- Stealth Communications, an Internet Service Provider in New York City
- Leo Stoller (born 1946), who claims "Stealth" as a trademark

== See also ==
- Camouflage
- Concealment device
- Confidentiality
- Covert operation
- Ninjutsu
- Secrecy
- Subterfuge (disambiguation)
