= Oswald Bastable =

- Created by: Michael Moorcock, inspired by E. Nesbit

In-universe information
- Gender: Male
- Nationality: English

Oswald Bastable is a fictional character created by Michael Moorcock. He is the protagonist in The Warlord of the Air, The Land Leviathan, and The Steel Tsar, and appears in other stories.

== Origin in Nesbit's Oswald Bastable ==
E. (Edith) Nesbit created a character named Oswald Bastable and his five siblings in the 1890s and featured them in numerous children's adventure stories narrated by Oswald. (These stories were completely separate from Nesbit's other children's fantasy adventures, Five Children and It and its sequels.) Many Bastable stories were first published in magazines as standalone pieces, not as parts of serialized novels, but they were later compiled into three episodic novels, The Story of the Treasure Seekers (1899), The Wouldbegoods (1901), and New Treasure Seekers (1904). Four more Bastable stories are in the collection Oswald Bastable and Others (1905).

Moorcock stated on the forums of his website that his use of the name "Oswald Bastable" was not supposed to directly link his character with Nesbit's (i.e. to make his novels into sequels). Rather, he said that he was trying to connect with a particular "Fabian 'liberal' imperialism, still fundamentally paternalistic but well-meaning" which he felt belonged to Nesbit's era. Edith Nesbit and her husband Hubert Bland had been among the founders and leading members of the Fabian Society. Its proclaimed aim was to eventually get to Socialism, but in a gradual non-revolutionary way. It can be said that in practice this made its members into proponents of a continued, reformed British Empire. Moorcock's Bastable books explore various variants on the theme of imperialism and colonialism: the British and other colonial empires persisting into the later 20th century, or conversely collapsing already in the early 1900s, and so on.

== Character biography ==
The original character was born 15 August, as stated on page 201 of The Wouldbegoods. Oswald Bastable was Captain of the 53rd Lancers in British India, and one of four brothers. In Moorcock's work, Bastable is an opium user, with opium playing somewhat the same role for him that Stormbringer does for Elric in Moorcock's "Elric Sequence" novels.

== Other books and stories by Moorcock ==
- In The English Assassin, he is described as a renegade Englishman and chief of General O T Shaw's air force when he attended the Peace Conference Ball.
- In another work, he is the Captain of the airship carrying Captain Nye to meet the leader of an anarchist army camped in Glen Coe.
- In another, he encounters Jherek Carnelian and Mrs Amelia Underwood in the Silurian (or possibly Lower Devonian) and takes them to the Time Centre maintained in that period, and was seen by Jherek as a rival for his affections.
