= The Martian General's Daughter =

2008 science fiction novel by Theodore Judson

- Author: Theodore Judson
- Language: English
- Genre: Science fiction novel
- Publisher: Pyr
- Publication date: 2008
- Publication place: United States
- Media type: Print (Hardcover, Paperback)
- ISBN: 978-1-59102-643-3
- OCLC: 192048110
- Dewey Decimal: 813/.6 22
- LC Class: PS3610.U533 M37 2008

The Martian General's Daughter is a 2008 science fiction novel by Theodore Judson. The novel takes the form of memoirs written by Justa Black, the illegitimate daughter of Peter Justice Black, a general of the fictional Pan-Polarian Empire.

== Plot ==
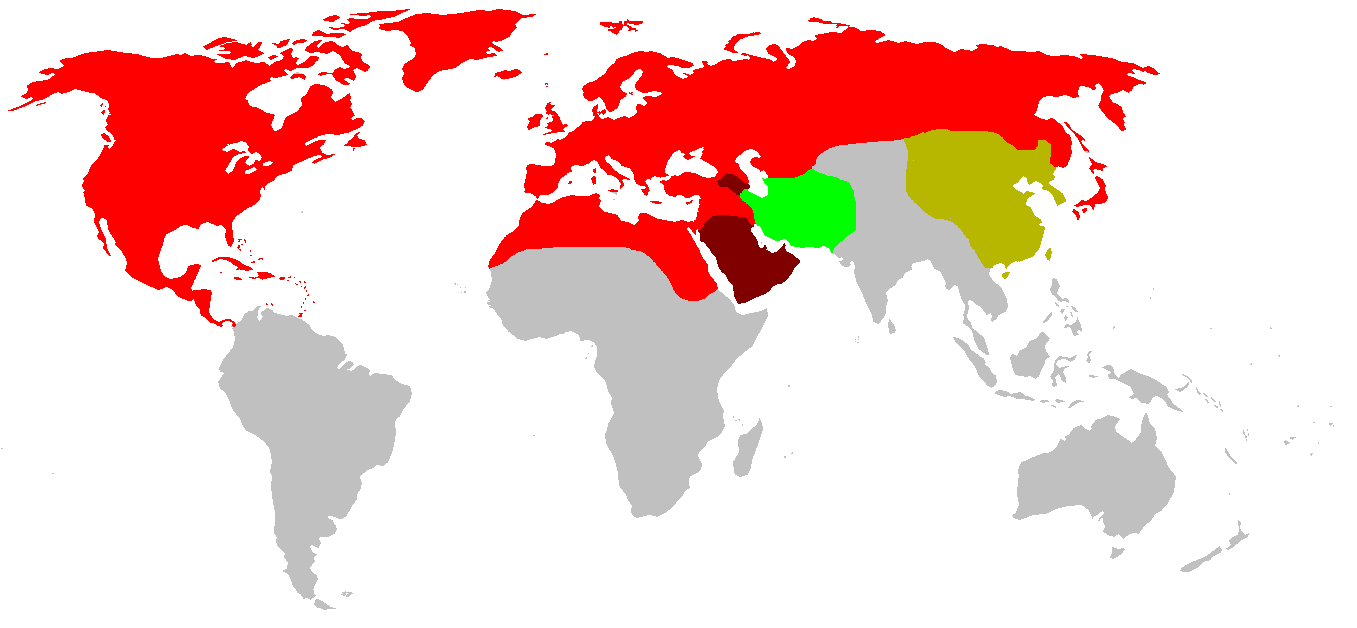
Map of the world described in the novel. The Pan-Polarian Empire is delineated in red, with territories mentioned as tributaries in maroon. The approximate locations of the Empire's primary rivals, Persia and China, are indicated in green and yellow, respectively.

As with his previous work Fitzpatrick's War, The Martian General's Daughter borrows heavily from classical history; in this case, the setting is reminiscent of the Roman Empire during the reign of Marcus Aurelius and his son, Commodus. Unlike Fitzpatrick's War, Judson provides a little background to explain how the world evolved into the shape outlined in the novel. The story takes place in the late twenty-third century, in which much of the Northern Hemisphere, as well as extraplanetary colonies on Mars and Jupiter, are dominated by the Pan-Polarian Empire, which is implicitly descended from the United States of America (though this is never expressly stated, references are made to the "old capital" near Maryland.) The Pan-Polarian society is based on that of Imperial Rome, including an imperial cult and a variety of polytheistic and monolatric religions that have largely replaced the major religions of our time, including the cults of "El Bis" and the goddess Marilyn.

The Empire's primary rivals are Persia and China, but it also fights against a number of enemies in Africa and South America. A nano-engineered plague has been released by one of the warring parties which causes metal to corrode and become useless; as a result, advanced technology is beginning to fail and the world is quickly degenerating to pre-industrial technology.

The setting alternates between chronicling the career of General Black (and his daughter's career as his aide-de-camp) during the 2270s and 2280s and his attempt to seize the Imperial throne in the 2290s during a multi-party struggle resembling the Year of the Four Emperors and the Crisis of the Third Century. General Black makes his career fighting under philosopher-emperor Mathias the Glistening, who perishes when his cybernetic implants become infected with the nano-plague. Mathias is succeeded by his sociopathic son, Luke Anthony, whose behavior becomes increasingly erratic over time. (Note: In one scene, Mathias reveals that he believes the empire to be totally irredeemable, and has made his son his successor in order to bring about its ruin; a similar motivation is ascribed to Claudius in Robert Graves's Claudius the God when Claudius names Nero his successor, citing Aesop's fable of "The Frogs Who Desired a King" as his inspiration.) Justa relates the excesses of Luke's regime, including his execution of perceived enemies, financial corruption, sexual perversion, etc. (Note: Luke's character is based on that of Commodus, though elements of other "mad emperors" of Rome are interwoven into the story, such as Caligula's self-deification, Elagabalus's changes to the state religion, and Caracalla's granting citizenship to all free men in the Empire to increase the tax rolls.)

General Black is made governor of Anatolia but is periodically recalled to provide various services to Luke. As a result of personally witnessing the Emperor's madness, General Black becomes more and more disillusioned and his health begins to suffer. Ultimately Luke is murdered and a struggle ensues between various short-reigned barracks emperors. By this time General Black and Justa are stationed on Mars, but when one of Black's political rivals seizes power, kills Black's family on Earth and infects Mars with the metal-eating nanoplague, Black's troops (many of them Boers, who are described as largely nomadic in the twenty-third century) declare him emperor and he leads an invasion force back to Earth. Although victorious in battle, the nanoplague renders the conflict moot as technology will no longer support an empire as large as the Pan-Polarian state, which crumbles into a myriad of ethnic and regional successor states. Ultimately, Justa and her father settle in Amsterdam, which has regained the prominence it enjoyed in the seventeenth and eighteenth centuries and is the center of a prosperous successor state, where Justa marries, has children, and assiduously avoids politics.

== In popular culture ==
- A character can be seen reading the book throughout the fifth season of Stargate Atlantis, most visibly in the episodes "Whispers" and "First Contact."
