= Hour of the Wolf (disambiguation) =

Hour of the Wolf is a 1968 film directed by Ingmar Bergman.

Hour of the Wolf or The Hour of the Wolf may refer to:

== Arts and entertainment ==
- Hour of the Wolf (novel), a 2013 novel by Andrius Tapinas
- Hour of the Wolf (radio show), literary WBAI radio show hosted by Jim Freund
- "The Hour of the Wolf", a 1996 episode of Babylon 5
- "The Hour of the Wolf", a 2017 episode of Beyond

=== Music ===
- Hour of the Wolf (album), a 1975 album by Steppenwolf
- Hour of the Wolf (song), a 2015 song by Elnur Hüseynov
- "The Hour of the Wolf", a 2008 song by Madrugada from Madrugada
- "Hour of the Wolf", a 2020 song by Ulver from Flowers of Evil

== See also ==
- The Wolf's Hour, the 1989 novel by Robert R. McCammon
