= Walk and Talk (film) =

2009 animated short film by Binoy Mathew

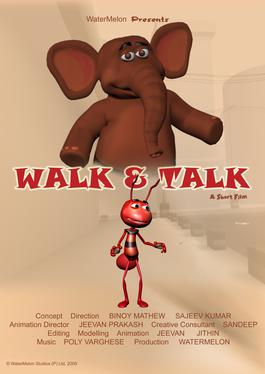
- Poster
- Directed by: Binoy Mathew & Sajeev Kumar
- Produced by: WaterMelon Studios, Kochi
- Edited by: Jeevan, Jithin
- Music by: Poly Varghese
- Release date: 2009
- Country: India
- Language: English

Walk and Talk is a 2009 animated short film produced by WaterMelon Studios, Kochi. The film was directed jointly by Binoy Mathew and Sajeev Kumar. The premiere took place at The Third International Documentary and Short Film Festival of Kerala 2010, in the competition section of animation films.

== Premise ==
When a person is engaged in a conversation on the mobile phone, it leaves the other person feeling left out.

== Production ==
Walk and Talk is the second directorial venture of Binoy Mathew and Sajeev Kumar whose first project is a 3D animation short film titled, The Stealth. It was selected for ATHENS ANIMFEST of 2009. Only two films were selected from India for Athens Anim Fest'09.
