= The Story of the Treasure Seekers =

1899 novel by E. Nesbit

- Author: E. Nesbit
- Illustrator: Gordon Browne, Lewis Baumer
- Language: English
- Series: Bastable
- Genre: Children's novel
- Publisher: T. Fisher Unwin
- Publication date: 1899
- Publication place: United Kingdom
- Media type: Print (hardback and paperback)
- Followed by: The Wouldbegoods

The Story of the Treasure Seekers is a novel by E. Nesbit first published in 1899. It tells the story of Dora, Oswald, Dicky, Alice, Noel, and Horace Octavius (H. O.) Bastable, and their attempts to assist their widowed father and recover the fortunes of their family. The novel's complete name is The Story of the Treasure Seekers: Being the Adventures of the Bastable Children in Search of a Fortune. The original edition included illustrations by H. R. Millar. The Puffin edition (1958) was illustrated by Cecil Leslie. Its sequels are The Wouldbegoods (1901) and The New Treasure Seekers (1904).

The story is told from a child's point of view. The narrator is Oswald, but on the first page he announces:

"It is one of us that tells this story – but I shall not tell you which: only at the very end perhaps I will. While the story is going on you may be trying to guess, only I bet you don't."

However, his occasional lapse into the first person, and the undue praise he likes to heap on himself, make his identity obvious to the attentive reader long before he reveals it himself.

== Plot ==
The Bastable family lives on the Lewisham Road in London in straitened circumstances, the widowed father having been cheated by his business partner. The children, Dora, the eldest, Oswald, the narrator, Dicky, Alice and Noel (10-year old twins), and H. O., the youngest, decide to restore the fortunes of their house by finding or earning treasure. They try various methods that work in books, such as digging for it, being bandits, marrying a princess, inventing a patent medicine, rescuing a rich gentleman, but somehow nothing is successful. However, during their imaginative adventures they make many friends.

== Publication ==
The Bastable stories from The Story of the Treasure Seekers were first published between 1894 and October 1899 in an assortment of periodicals: Nister's Holiday Annual, the Illustrated London News and its supplement Father Christmas, The Pall Mall Magazine, and the Windsor Magazine.

The order in which the chapters appeared was changed for the one-volume publication in 1899. Some of them also underwent extensive rewriting.

== Influence on other literature ==
The Story of the Treasure Seekers was the first novel for children by E. Nesbit. This and her later novels exerted considerable influence on subsequent English children's literature, most notably Arthur Ransome's books and C. S. Lewis' The Chronicles of Narnia. Lewis notes in the first chapter of The Magician's Nephew that the portion of the action of that book that takes place in this world happens at the same time as that of the Treasure Seekers. The American writer Edward Eager was also influenced by this and other Nesbit books, most notably in his Half Magic series, where he mentions the Bastable children and other Nesbit characters as heroes of his characters.

Nesbit's influence on other British and American children's literature rests largely on the following motifs: her protagonists are a set or sets of siblings from a separated or incomplete family. The events of the story take place while the children are isolated as a group, for example, while on holiday. Through magic or complex imaginative play, the children face perils that they overcome through pluck. Another notable feature is the depiction of the realistic quarrels and faults of the children. J. K. Rowling, writer of Harry Potter, ranked Nesbit as one of her favourite authors, and The Story of the Treasure Seekers as her favourite of Nesbit's books.

British writer Michael Moorcock later used the character, or at least the name, of Oswald Bastable for the hero and first-person narrator of his trilogy A Nomad of the Time Streams, published from 1971 until 1981, an influence on the nascent genre of steampunk.

== TV adaptations ==
The book has been made into TV series three times, in 1953, 1961, and 1982. It was made into a television movie as The Treasure Seekers in 1996.

Puffin Classics edition

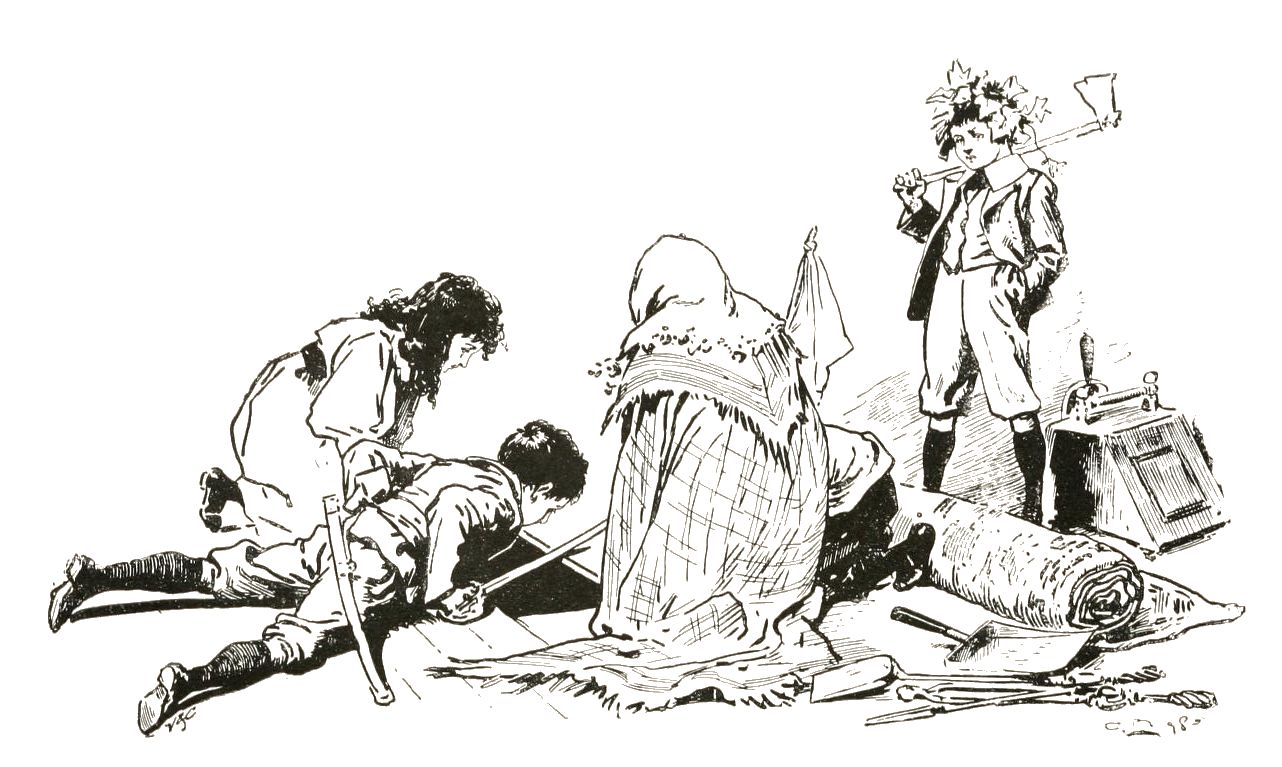
Illustration by Gordon Browne

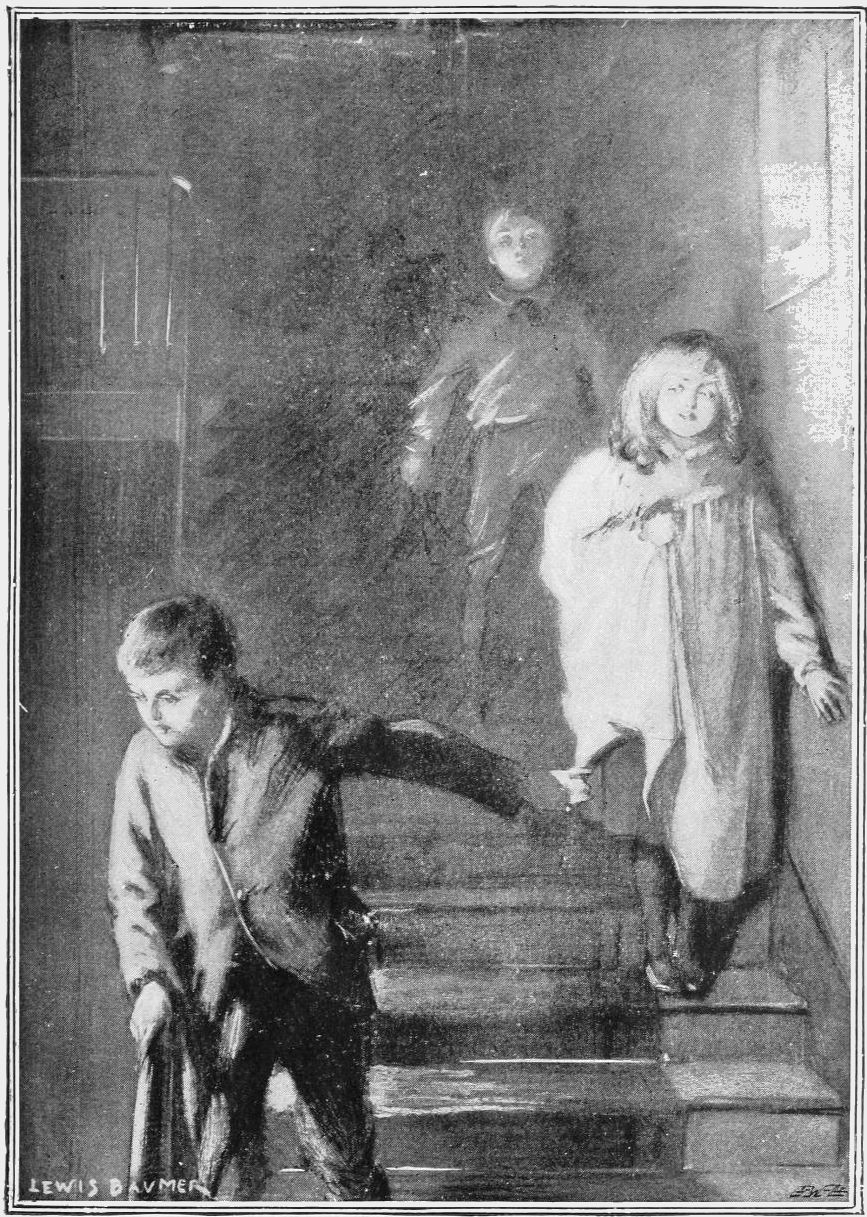
Illustration by Lewis Baumer
