= Subterfuge =

Subterfuge may refer to:

- Deception, causing someone to believe something that is not true

== Music ==
- "Subterfuge", track from The Hidden Land album by Béla Fleck and the Flecktones
- "Subterfuge", track from Demolition (Judas Priest album)
- "Subterfuge", track from Black Fire (album)
- "Subterfuge", track from Oppressing the Masses
- "Subterfuge", track from Run Cold album from Diva Destruction
- "Subterfuge", track from Zeno Beach
- "Subterfuge", a music video by Dååth
- ”Subterfuge”, track from Sonic Legacy by Honkish

== Film ==
- Subterfuge (1968 film), a British film starring Joan Collins
- Subterfuge (1996 film), an American film starring Matt McColm
- Subterfuge (1912 film), an American silent film
- "The Subterfuge", an episode from The Fatal Ring, a 1917 American action film serial

== Other ==
- "Subterfuge", a 1959 science fiction story by Charles Eric Maine
- "Subterfuge", a 1943 short story by Ray Bradbury published in Astonishing Stories
- Subterfuge (video game), a 2015 mobile game
- A nickname for the United Kingdom's Central Government War Headquarters
