= The Land Leviathan: A New Scientific Romance =

1974 novel by Michael Moorcock

The Land Leviathan
- First UK edition
- Author: Michael Moorcock
- Cover artist: Chris Foss
- Language: English
- Series: Oswald Bastable
- Genre: Science fiction novel
- Publisher: Quartet (UK); Doubleday (US)
- Publication date: 1974
- Publication place: United Kingdom
- Media type: Print (hardback and paperback)
- Pages: 161 pp
- ISBN: 0-7043-2018-5
- Preceded by: Warlord of the Air
- Followed by: The Steel Tsar

The Land Leviathan is an alternative history novel by Michael Moorcock, first published in 1974. Originally subtitled "A New Scientific Romance", it has been seen as an early steampunk novel, dealing with an alternative British Imperial history dominated by airships and futuristic warfare. It is a sequel to Warlord of the Air (1971) and followed by The Steel Tsar (1981). This proto-steampunk trilogy is also published as the compilation volume A Nomad of the Time Streams.

== Plot summary ==
The story of Oswald Bastable's adventures "trapped forever in the shifting tides of time" is framed with the concept of the book being a long lost manuscript, as related by Moorcock's grandfather. Several years after Bastable disappeared in 1910, the elder Moorcock travels to China in an attempt to track him down, meeting Una Persson of the Jerry Cornelius novels on the way who before disappearing leaves him a manuscript written by Bastable for Moorcock, relating what happened to Bastable after he unexpectedly left the elder Moorcock at the end of Warlord of the Air, probably bound for another alternate twentieth century.

Bastable's story takes place in a post-apocalyptic early twentieth century between 1904 and 1908, where Western Europe and the United States have been devastated by accelerated technological change caused by a prolific Chilean inventor, which led to a prolonged global war causing their reversion to barbarism. By contrast, South Africa, rechristened Bantustan, is ruled by President Mohandas Gandhi, has never had apartheid, and is an oasis of civilisation which stayed out of the conflict being an affluent, technologically advanced nation in this alternate, anti-imperialist twentieth century. To restore civilisation and social order in the afflicted Northern Hemisphere, a 'Black Attila', General Cicero Hood, leads an African army to beneficent if paternalist conquest of Europe and an apocalyptic war against the United States featuring the "vast, moving ziggurat of destruction" of the title.

The historical personage of our world appearing as alternate versions of themselves include:

- Mahatma Gandhi is president of the wealthy, Marxist Republic of Bantustan;
- Al Capone is a dashing flyer for the Republic of Bantustan (although the novel takes place before the real Capone was 10 years old).
- Herbert Hoover is a racist New York City gangster organizing the city's last stand against the black, African-based Ashanti Empire. White Americans have re-introduced African-American slavery as they blame the latter as scapegoats for epidemics that were actually initiated by biological warfare among the perished Western nations;
- P. J. Kennedy is an amateur explosives hack which makes him the local mob lord or tribal chief of Wilmington (it is not made clear whether this is Wilmington, New York, Wilmington Township, Lawrence County, Pennsylvania, or Wilmington Township, Mercer County, Pennsylvania or Wilmington, Delaware, only that it is situated between New York City and Washington, DC.)
- Frederic Courtland Penfield, formerly a US diplomat in our world as well as the one Bastable visits, is founder of a new Ku Klux Klan. He also serves as a nominal 'president' over a de facto, skeletal 'United States', in Washington, DC. The former capital has been surprisingly immune from bombing and missile attack (as the government had fled into subterranean shelters at the beginning of the Great War) which makes up most of his realm. In some editions, the character is renamed "Beesley", whose description resembles that of Bishop Beesley, a character from the Jerry Cornelius novels.
- Paul Robeson is a leader of slaves in Washington, DC.
- Joseph Conrad as submarine captain Joseph Korzeniowski.

== Major themes ==
Martin Wisse noted that the book "is quite obviously a commentary on the 'yellow peril' and 'black peril' novel of the late 19th and early 20th century, with its unthinking racism, love of superweapons and willingness to commit genocide of the 'lesser races'. Here the formula is inverted, and the sympathies of the writer and reader are with Gandhi and the 'Black Attila', shown as a genuinely good man". They are contrasted with the impoverished, tribalised white supremacists of the devastated former United States, which has reintroduced African American slavery. Bastable accuses Hood of "genocide" though the word was not coined until 1943 in reality.

== Publication history ==
It was first published in 1974 and has remained in print, in various editions, ever since.

== Reception ==
David Dunham reviewed The Warlord of the Air, The Land Leviathan, and The Steel Tsar for Different Worlds magazine and stated that "Eternal Champion cycle or not, I enjoyed these stories. There were lots of subtle ironies, such as Gandhi's pacifistic republic, and the identity of the Steel Tsar himself. The alternate histories were all relevant to our own-at the root of each conflict was a struggle for freedom and justice. My biggest complaint is that they are rather short."

== Reviews ==
- Review by uncredited (1974) in Vertex: The Magazine of Science Fiction, December 1974
- Review by Marta Randall (1974) in Locus, #168 24 December 1974
- Review by Lynne Holdom (1975) in Science Fiction Review, November 1975
- Review by Thomas J. Murn (1976) in Janus, June 1976
- Review by Don D'Ammassa (1976) in Delap's F & SF Review, July 1976
- Review [Dutch] by Frank Roger (1976) in Holland-SF 1976, #6
- Review [French] by Jean-Pierre Andrevon (1977) in Fiction, #278

== See also ==
- "The Land Ironclads" – a short story by H. G. Wells
