= For the Crown and the Dragon =

1994 novel by Stephen Hunt

First edition Cover artist: Philip Rowlands

For the Crown and the Dragon is a novel by Stephen Hunt published by Green Nebula in 1994.

== Plot summary ==
The novel is a story of an 18th-century Britain split into three islands ruled by an isolationist regime, while the rest of Europe consists of city states at war with one another.

== Reception ==
Gideon Kibblewhite reviewed For the Crown and the Dragon for Arcane magazine, rating it a 7 out of 10 overall. Kibblewhite comments that "the tale is stranger and more cynical than a mere Sherwood Forest chestnut, and the raft of great characters have a black sense of humour to match. The battles are likewise well done, so that we are soon spattered not only with blood and gore, but with dirt, filth, ran and brine as well."

== Reviews ==
- Review by Carolyn Cushman (1995) in Locus, #408 January 1995
