= Steam Trek: The Moving Picture =

1994 short film

- Directed by: Dennis Sisterson
- Written by: Dennis Sisterson; Ashley Levy
- Starring: Jon Chapman; Pete Dummer; Ashley Levy; Liz Sanders; Dave Seymour; Tom Paterson; Glenn Maloney
- Cinematography: Liz Tuckett
- Release date: October 4, 1994
- Running time: 11 minutes
- Language: English

Steam Trek: The Moving Picture is a 1994 fan film that was made by fans of original Star Trek. It was directed by Dennis Sisterson and written by Dennis Sisterson and Ashley Levy. It parodies the television show as a silent film.

== Premise ==
In the year 1980, the starship USS Isambard explores an unknown planet in hopes of finding more coal. However, the away team – led by Captain James T. Shirt (Jon Chapman) – find Klingons and a coal monster on the planet's surface.

== Production ==
Steam Trek: The Moving Picture was made in 1994 by the Ad Hoc Film Society. The idea originated from a story outline by Ashley Levy entitled Star Trek - The Silent Generation. Filming was done with Super 8 mm film.

== Release ==
The film premiered at the Archon Convention in August 1994. Digitized and restored version premiered 2014-06-27 at Swecon 2014/Steampunkfestival 2014 in the city of Gävle, Sweden.

== Reception ==
Boing Boing's Cory Doctorow reviewed Steam Trek: The Moving Picture as "great, Voyage to the Moon-style graphics and hilarious slates for dialog." Gizmodo reviewed it as a "beautifully done Star Trek parody, created in 1994 but looking like it was made a hundred years ago." TechRepublic called it a "hilarious send-up of both Star Trek and steampunk tropes rendered as a gleefully tongue-in-cheek silent movie". Wired called it "stunning".
