= Neptune's Pride =

2010 4X video game

- Logo
- Developer: Iron Helmet Games
- Publisher: Iron Helmet Games
- Designer: Jay Kyburz
- Series: Neptune's Pride
- Engine: App Engine
- Platform: Browser game
- Release: 2010
- Genres: 4X space trading and combat game
- Mode: Multi-player

Neptune's Pride is a 2010 browser-based 4X video game, created by Australian studio Iron Helmet Games.

== Production ==
Neptune's Pride was partially designed by Penny Sweetser, whose doctoral thesis focused on emergent play as a design strategy.

== Gameplay ==
Players can produce, research, explore, and colonize star systems. The goal of the game is to capture a specified percentage of all total stars; a game can last for up to a month, or even longer, with events progressing in real time, even when players are logged out. Diplomacy is an important part of the game, with alliance-building and betrayal of allies playing a major role.

== Reception ==
PC Gamer UK named Neptune's Pride as Webgame of the Year.

In 2011, it was listed in the book 1001 Video Games You Must Play Before You Die.
