= Stephen Hunt (author) =

British fantasy writer

- Born: May 5, 1966 (age 60); Canada
- Occupations: Writer, computer programmer, publisher
- Writing career
- Genres: Historical fantasy, alternate history, science fiction, fantasy
- Subject: Fantasy adventure set on a far-future Earth
- Movements: Flintlock fantasy, steampunk, space opera
- Website: stephenhunt.net

Stephen Hunt (5 May 1966) is a British writer of fantasy novels. He was born in Canada and studied in the United Kingdom. He worked for a time managing online services for a number of newspapers and journals until he broke into writing in the 90's.

His writing influences include Jack Williamson, Stephen Goldin, David Gemmell, Bruce Sterling, Larry Niven and Michael Moorcock.

== Career ==
Hunt's stories have appeared in various magazines in the US and UK. Some of his earliest works were written in the cyberpunk style. One of these was The Hollow Duelists, which won the 1992 ProtoStellar Prize for Best Short Fiction Story.

Hunt's first fantasy novel, For the Crown and the Dragon, was published in 1994 after winning the WH Smith's New Talent Award. Reviewer Andrew Darlington used Hunt's novel to coin the phrase "Flintlock Fantasy", describing the subgenre of fantasy set in a Regency or Napoleonic-era period.

In 2005, Hunt became the first client of the John Jarrold Literary Agency. His second novel, The Court of the Air, the first of Hunt's Jackelian series, was published by HarperCollins in 2007. The Court of the Air was one of ten books selected by the Berlinale Film Festival/Co-Production Market organisers for presentation to US and European film producers.

Later works include the Sliding Void series, published under the Green Nebula imprint, and the Far-called series, the first book of which, In Dark Service, was published by Gollancz in 2014.

In 2011, Hunt was among 85 authors - which included Iain M Banks, Elizabeth Moon and Michael Moorcock - who wrote to the BBC's director general, Mark Thompson, attacking its "sneering" coverage of genre fiction on World Book Day. The BBC subsequently asserted its commitment to genre fiction in all forms.

== Bibliography ==
=== Standalone novels ===
- Six Against the Stars (2020)
- The Pashtun Boy's Paradise (2020)

=== Triple Realm ===
1. —— (1994). For the Crown and the Dragon. Greenwood Publishing Group. ISBN 9780952288503.
2. —— (2020). The Fortress in the Frost.

=== The Agatha Witchley Mysteries series ===
1. —— (2015). Secrets of the Moon. CreateSpace Independent Publishing Platform. ISBN 1514238411.

=== The Songs of Old Sol series ===
1. —— (2018). Empty Between the Stars. CreateSpace Independent Publishing Platform. ISBN 1983183989.

=== Jackelian series ===
1. —— (2007). The Court of the Air. HarperCollins. ISBN 0007232179.
2. —— (2008). The Kingdom Beyond the Waves. HarperCollins. ISBN 0007232209.
3. —— (2009). The Rise of the Iron Moon. HarperCollins. ISBN 9780007232222.
4. —— (2010). Secrets of the Fire Sea. HarperCollins. ISBN 9780007289639.
5. —— (2011). Jack Cloudie. HarperCollins. ISBN 9780007289646.
6. —— (2012). From the Deep of the Dark. HarperCollins. ISBN 9780007289714.
7. —— (2015). Mission to Mightadore. CreateSpace Independent Publishing Platform. ISBN 1982997567.

=== Far-called series ===
1. —— (2014). In Dark Service. Gollancz. ISBN 0575092068.

=== 'Sliding Void' ===
1. —— (2014). Void All the Way Down. CreateSpace Independent Publishing Platform. ISBN 9781508922193.

== Reviews ==
- The Fantasy Book Critic. "The Kingdom Beyond the Waves". The Fantasy Book Critic.
- Jeff VanderMeer. "The Court of the Air". Omnivoracious.
