= Tephra: The Steampunk RPG =

Role-playing game

- Playing Guide
- Designers: Daniel A. Burrow
- Publishers: Parlor, LLC. (formerly known as Cracked Monocle)
- Publication: 2012
- Years active: 2012 – current
- Genres: Steampunk
- Systems: Clockwork System
- Playing time: Varies
- Chance: Dice rolling
- Skills: Role-playing, improvisation, tactics, arithmetic
- Website: Tephra RPG

Tephra: The Steampunk RPG (2012) is a steampunk role-playing game designed by Daniel A. Burrow and published by Parlor LLC. (formerly known as Cracked Monocle).

== Publication history ==
The Tephra Kickstarter campaign successfully raised $22,821 exceeding their $1,000 goal on February 4, 2012. On January 6, 2014, an update was posted indicating that some international backers still did not have copies of the core rule book. Cracked Monocle was an exhibitor at SXSW Gaming in 2014. On July 30, 2014, Daniel Burrow announced his resignation as the head of Cracked Monocle. His inability to fulfill the Kickstarter rewards on time was cited as one reason for his resignation. Backers in the United States all received the core book and the Adversary book was released as a PDF download to donors on November 29, 2014. An announcement was made June 15, 2015, that physical copies of the Adversary book would be sent to all backers within two weeks along with Tephra core books for the remaining international backers. On July 2, 2015, Daniel Burrow announced that he had returned to Cracked Monocle and completed the fulfillment of the Kickstarter.

In January 2017, the Tephra core book was released to the Open Game License. On August 2, 2017, it was announced that Cracked Monocle had officially changed their name to Parlor, LLC.

== Play overview ==
Tephra employs the Clockwork System. This system uses only one die, a d12, to make all rolls. Twelves "explode," so rolling a 12 allows the player to roll again and add to the prior roll. For example, rolling a 12 and then a 7 gives a result of 19. On the other side, "A 1 is a 1." If a player rolls a 1, they cannot add any modifiers to that roll (though negative modifiers still apply). As a result, any roll other than a 1 will tend to beat a roll of 1.

Levels go from 1 to 12. Player attributes are derived from the points they invest in skills. The five attributes are Brute, Cunning, Dexterity, Spirit, and Science. All have four skills except Science, which has 6. When a skill or attribute is rolled to check for a success, that number is added to the result of the roll. Success is measured in tiers: tier one means a basic no-frills success while a tier four, the highest level, means success beyond any human expectation.

Combat stats are derived from the specialties players choose. A player may choose a specialty from any skill they have points in. Priority determines initiative. Augments and DIY are used in crafting (which are generally part of the Sciences skills).

Combat involves two dice rolls for each of the combatants: accuracy vs. evade and strike vs. defense. Accuracy determines whether the attack hits; for ranged attacks (firearms, crossbows, etc.) it also determines the damage. Strike determines the amount of damage done by melee attacks if the attack succeeds. Evade is used by the person being attacked to dodge the blow entirely; it is rolled against accuracy. If the attack hits, the target can roll defense to absorb some or all of the damage. Damage (accuracy, strike) and damage absorption (defense) are tiered. Each tier multiplies the base damage or armor soak class. A character wielding a firearm with damage class 6 who gets a tier 3 accuracy will deal 18 damage if it successfully hits. A character with armor of soak class 4 who rolls a tier 2 defense will absorb 8 damage.

== Setting ==
The setting contains many aspects of steampunk, including trains, airships, and large numbers of independent inventors. There are a number of biomes, such as forests, deserts, grasslands, and jungles. Electricity is present in some parts of the continent, but is still a novelty. The use of fossil fuels is absent with steampower – often powered by aether resonators – the dominant power source.

The game is set on another planet, known as Tephra. It is orbited by a single fractured moon, Aeon. The main continent is Rilausia, which has several countries, each with different themes. The central country is Evangless, which is ruled by a monarchy and where slavery is banned. To the southeast is Zelhost, a heavily industrialized nation populated by Haudi Humans that uses slave labor. To the southwest is Izeda, a desert nation whose people travel in caravans. To the northeast is Dalvozzea, governed by a ruling council of Winged Farishtaas, angelic beings with large wings capable of flight. In the northwest is Arakrith, a nation ruled by former satyr slaves who won their freedom from Haudis.

The core races of Tephra are humans, ayodin, elves, farishtaa, gnomes, and satyrs. Ayodin are sea-going mammals who can breathe on land and in the water. Elves are hulking brutes, tall and muscular, but hunched over and with mottled bruised skin. Farishtaa resemble the classic fantasy elves and are created by scientifically injecting essence into an elf. Satyrs were genetically engineered by Haudis to act as slaves by fusing humans with hoofed animals such as goats, cows, and horses.

== Reception ==
Tephra was nominated for "Best Steampunk RPG or LARP" in the 2014 Steampunk Chronicle Reader's Choice Awards and its creator, Daniel Burrow, won the award for "Best Steampunk Game Creator."
