= Jean-Christophe Valtat =

French writer and teacher

- Born: 1968 (age 57–58)
- Citizenship: French
- Education: École Normale Supérieure, University of Paris III: Sorbonne Nouvelle (PhD)
- Occupations: Author, educator, actor, director
- Writing career
- Language: French, English
- Notable awards: Fondation Beaumarchais-France Culture-Villa Médicis prize for La vie inimitable (2000);

Jean-Christophe Valtat (born 1968) is a French writer and teacher. He was educated at École Normale Supérieure and the University of Paris III: Sorbonne Nouvelle. He has taught Comparative Literature at Blaise Pascal University in Clermont-Ferrand, and at Paul Valéry University in Montpellier, France, where he researches romantic, modern and contemporary literature, and the relationships between literature, science, technology and the media.

He is the author of the steampunk novels Aurorarama (2010), and Luminous Chaos (2013) published by Melville House. Aurorarama was short-listed for a Red Tentacle Kitschie in 2010, and nominated for the John W. Campbell Memorial Award for Best Science Fiction Novel in 2011. He also authored two other novels, Exes, and 03, which famous literary critic James Wood picked as one of the best books of 2010, published by Farrar, Straus and Giroux, and a book of short stories, Album. He has also written the award-winning radio play La vie inimitable and a movie Augustine (2003), which he also co-directed.

== Published reviews ==
- James Wood (30 August 2010). "Take a Girl Like You. Desire and despair in Jean-Christophe Valtat's English-language début.". The New Yorker.
- Jessa Crispin (10 September 2010). "Sly, Sinister 'Aurorarama': An Arctic Utopia In Peril". NPR.
- Emma Garman (August 2010). "Jean-Christophe Valtat's "03"". Words Without Borders.
