= Subterfuge (video game) =

2015 video game

- App icon of the game
- Developers: Ron Carmel and Noel Llopis (2015–2023); Albert Reed (2023—present)
- Publishers: Snappy Touch (2015–2023); Game Shovel (2023—present)
- Platforms: iOS, Android
- Release: NA: October 15, 2015
- Genre: Real-time strategy

Subterfuge is a real-time strategy video game developed by Ron Carmel and Noel Llopis. A wargame loosely based on the games Diplomacy and Neptune's Pride, it takes place in an underwater world where players use diplomacy and tactics to defeat their opponents, expand their territory, and gain resources. It features minimalist art, except for the specialist portraits, which were drawn by Shane Nakamura.

In 2023, after a long period of inactivity from the developers, Subterfuge was acquired by the indie game development company Game Shovel for the purpose of continued support. An update was also released for the Android version of the game, bringing it in line with modern app requirements and effectively reviving the game for many players who had lost access.

On 11 September 2026, it was announced that Subterfuge was coming to steam.

== Gameplay ==
Subterfuge is loosely based on the strategic board game Diplomacy and the 4X browser game Neptune's Pride, which are known for fair and equal combat systems requiring players to team up and deceive others to tip the balance of power.

The game simulates a resource war between players who start from nothing, and slowly expand their territory to create mines and gain the game's primary resource, neptunium. The game takes place in real time to allow for diplomacy; an average game lasts 7 to 10 days but can be longer or shorter. Despite taking a week to play, the developers claimed the game was still "short". A game supports anywhere from 2 to 10 players. Diplomacy is highly encouraged in Subterfuge, and players only communicate via in-game messages. This allows for the negotiation of strategy and teamwork which is vital for players to win, since a team of multiple players is more capable of eliminating a target than one player would be alone. To win a normal game, a player must gain 200 neptunium through mines, which can be constructed by combat units that are not currently being used to fight other players. Over the course of a game, players must fight over outposts spread across the map in an attempt to increase production capacity and rate for combat units. "Dominion rules" are also available, where the goal is to control a certain amount of outposts instead.

In Subterfuge, there's no supranational authority governing player conduct, no enforceable contracts and no guarantee that any agreement will be honored beyond the self-interest of the players involved. As such, every alliance made is a matter of trust. Players may routinely strike agreements to coordinate, plan attacks, gift resources and divide territory with one another. However nothing prevents the player(s) from leaking information, disseminating disinformation or engaging in other acts of treachery designed to work against the goals of other players.

=== Time machine ===
Due to the 24 hour nature of the game, Subterfuge does not require a player to be in the game to issue moves (orders): players can plan orders in advance using the time machine feature, allowing complex maneuvers to be performed. The time machine also allows the viewing of past events and a prediction of the future based on player knowledge. The time machine works by letting players go to the time they wished to have the order executed; they then played the game as if it were in the present. When the set amount of time had passed, the order would be carried out, even if the player is not present. Developer Ron Carmel said that he implemented this feature based on previous experience playing Neptune's Pride, which lacked this feature, leading to inconvenience. While most players can only schedule four moves using the time machine, players who have bought the full game can issue an unlimited amount of future orders. The time machine also moves forward when the player launches a submarine, which shows the player what the map will look like when the sub arrives.

== Reception ==
Subterfuge has been met with mostly positive reception; it has been praised for having simplicity and tactical depth. Pocket Tactics gave it the award for the best multiplayer game of 2015. Three weeks after launch, Subterfuge had been installed 113,000 times on Android and 107,000 times on iOS; it earned $23,000 in the three-week period.
