= Black Peril =

The Black Peril refers to the fear of colonial settlers that black men are attracted to white women and are having sexual relations with them. This may go back to class and race prejudices, Examples of class and racial prejudice can be seen in British colonialism of India and Africa. One of the major areas that has been written and documented in having experienced the Black Peril is South Africa, or more specifically in certain writings, Southern Rhodesia, which later became the modern-day country Zimbabwe in 1980. Black Peril is a colonial based fear that started in Southern Rhodesia and survived all the way to the independence of Zimbabwe.

Black rape scares were not unique or scarce to South Africa since well-documented parallels have ranged in place and time from "the southern United States in the late 1860s' to Papua in the 1920s". It was theorized that the fear of this Black Peril, the rape threats, as seen through the eyes of the white male settlers, were essentially a "rationalization of white men's fear of sexual competition from black men".

The "'Black Peril' outcries from white settlers in Southern Rhodesia provided an outlet for anxieties about weakness within the 'body politic'" since the 'Whites shared a conceptual language for crisis and it was corporeal'. It was through this thought process that the 'Black Peril' panics led to specific actions that served the interests of the white settler men in these areas.

== History ==
The Black Peril scares 'embittered race relations' in South Africa during the years before the First World War. In Southern Rhodesia, the situation was even more traumatic, since the 'black peril' scare of the early 1900s came in the wake of the 1896 war of resistance. Resultant embitterment lingered to the extent that throughout the first decades of colonialism there were periodic campaigns to control the supposedly excessive fundamental urges of African men. Much more clandestine, but far more of a reality was the rarely noted 'white peril', a wide range of sexual abuse of black women (and occasionally men) by settler males.

== South Africa ==
During the 1900s, in response to these rapes, the Government of South Africa tried to control it through setting up a program of national human population control which would theoretically encompasses these three distinct elements; limitation on women's Fertility, change in human mortality rates and control of Immigration. At this time birth control did not have an official program so the government turned to other methods and elements in population control. Thus through this Black Peril scare the government of South Africa adopted specific policies on each of these three which, taken together, attempted to limit the black population while maintaining a large white population.

As late as the 1911 census white men outnumbered white women by nearly two to one. It was not until 1921 that females reached 40 per cent of the settler population and census takers could boast that 'the population has now attained a settled character comparable with that of much older countries'. Along the road to that settled character white males in Rhodesia often soothed their feelings of isolation by sexual relations with black women. These sexual encounters were not usually based on mutual attraction but on coercion. As two observers have noted they were 'similar to those between masters and slaves, feudal lords and serfs, conquerors and conquered in other countries'. This side of the interracial sexual coin was the 'white peril', a term which rarely appeared in Rhodesian annals.

== South Rhodesia (Zimbabwe) ==
The 'black peril' became a public issue in the settler community within South Rhodesia just after the turn of the century. In colonial Rhodesia the fear of 'black peril' spawned a wide range of legislation, including the prohibition of sexual relations between white women and black men. In addition, dozens of blacks were executed, both legally and extra-legally, for supposed 'black peril' violations.

The rise of alleged sexual attacks on white women around 1902 was, according to settler consensus due to an influx into Southern Rhodesia of a few prostitutes who were racially undiscerning in choosing their customers. A government report of 1914 presented this historical analysis: On the question of prostitution by white women with natives it is pertinent to state that the prevalence of 'black peril' during the years 1902 and 1903 in Bulawayo was mainly attributed by the public to the presence and operation of the women referred to in the instances quoted under the heading of 'white peril'.

Perhaps frightened by the rise of both non-discriminating white women and vigilantism, the Legislative Assembly took its own action passing the Immorality Suppression Ordinance in September 1903. According to this law a man could face the death penalty for anything which constituted 'attempted rape'. The legislation also affected maximum sentences of two years imprisonment for white women and five years for black men who engaged in interracial sex. Even these penalties were not sufficient to please all the whites.

In Zimbabwe many black men were channeled into domestic service, as well as the mining and farming labors. In fact, throughout the first half century of colonialism domestic service ranked third as a source of African employment, therefore that meant that white women spent most of their days alone with black male servants. It would be in this situation that the complex paranoia called the 'black peril' would be manufactured.

In contrast, by one account 'white peril', or sexual abuse of black women by white men, was far more frequent. Despite these protestations, there was never any law passed to prohibit white men from having sexual relations with black women. One theory for the differing official response to the 'black' and 'white perils' was the nature of race, class and gender relations in the colony. The 'perils' were necessary to solidify racial and gender differences and thereby to construct white and male supremacist social order.

== See also ==
- Yellow peril
- Red Scare
- Princess Milica of Montenegro and Princess Anastasia of Montenegro collectively known as the black peril.
