= A Nomad of the Time Streams =

1982 novel by Michael Moorcock

- Dust-jacket from the first edition.
- Author: Michael Moorcock
- Original title: The Nomad of Time
- Cover artist: Fred Labitzke
- Language: English
- Genre: Science fiction
- Publisher: Science Fiction Book Club
- Publication date: 1982
- Publication place: United States
- Media type: Print (hardback)
- Pages: 442

A Nomad of the Time Streams is a compilation volume of Michael Moorcock's early steampunk trilogy, begun in 1971 with The Warlord of the Air and continued by its 1974 and 1981 sequels, The Land Leviathan and The Steel Tsar. The trilogy follows the adventures of Edwardian-era British Army Captain Oswald Bastable in alternate versions of the 20th century.

== Plot ==
=== The Warlord of the Air ===
In the first book, The Warlord of the Air, Bastable finds himself transported to an alternate late-20th century Earth where the European powers did not stir each other into a World War and in which the mighty airships of a British Empire on which the sun never sets are threatened by the rise of new and terrible enemies. These enemies turn out to be the colonized peoples trying to break free, supported by anarchist and socialist Western saboteurs opposing their own imperialist societies, and led by a Chinese general whose country is still nominally under Western control and ravaged by civil war.

=== The Land Leviathan ===
In The Land Leviathan, Bastable visits an alternate 1904 in which most of the Western world has been devastated around the turn of the 20th century by a short, yet terrible war fought with futuristic devices and in which biological weapons were also used. In this alternate world, an Afro-American "Black Attila" is conquering the remnants of the Western nations, destroyed by the wars. The only remaining stable surviving nations, aside from the African-based Ashanti Empire, are an isolationist Australasian-Japanese Federation, which opposes the Ashanti Empire, and the wealthy Marxist Republic of Bantustan, formerly known as South Africa, which is led by its Indian-born president Mahatma Gandhi; having never known apartheid or hostilities between the British and the Boers, it is a wealthy, pacifist utopia, in which there is no racial tension.

=== The Steel Tsar ===
In the final book, The Steel Tsar, Bastable witnesses an alternate 1941 where Great Britain and Germany became allies around the turn of the 20th century and thus neither the War of 1914 nor the October Revolution took place. In this world's Russian Empire, a much more stable and democratic nation than the real Russia has ever been, Bastable encounters a terrorist group which seeks to overthrow the Russian government and install a theocracy led by the religious fanatic Iosif Vissarionovich Dzhugashvili.

== Style and themes ==
In an ironic to postmodernist framework yet strictly writing in the language of a 19th-century adventure romance, Moorcock explores themes of racism, imperialism, socialist and anarchist politics, and the impact of technology in the nascent steampunk genre which this trilogy did much to help develop.

== Contents ==
- The Warlord of the Air
- The Land Leviathan
- The Steel Tsar

== Publication history ==
The omnibus edition was first published in 1982 by the Science Fiction Book Club as The Nomad of Time. It appeared under the title A Nomad of the Time Streams in editions by Millennium in 1992 and by White Wolf, Inc. in 1995. Portions of the series were significantly rewritten for the 1992 edition. Golancz published it as The Nomad of Time in 2014.
