= Binoy Mathew =

Indian ad film maker (born 1972)

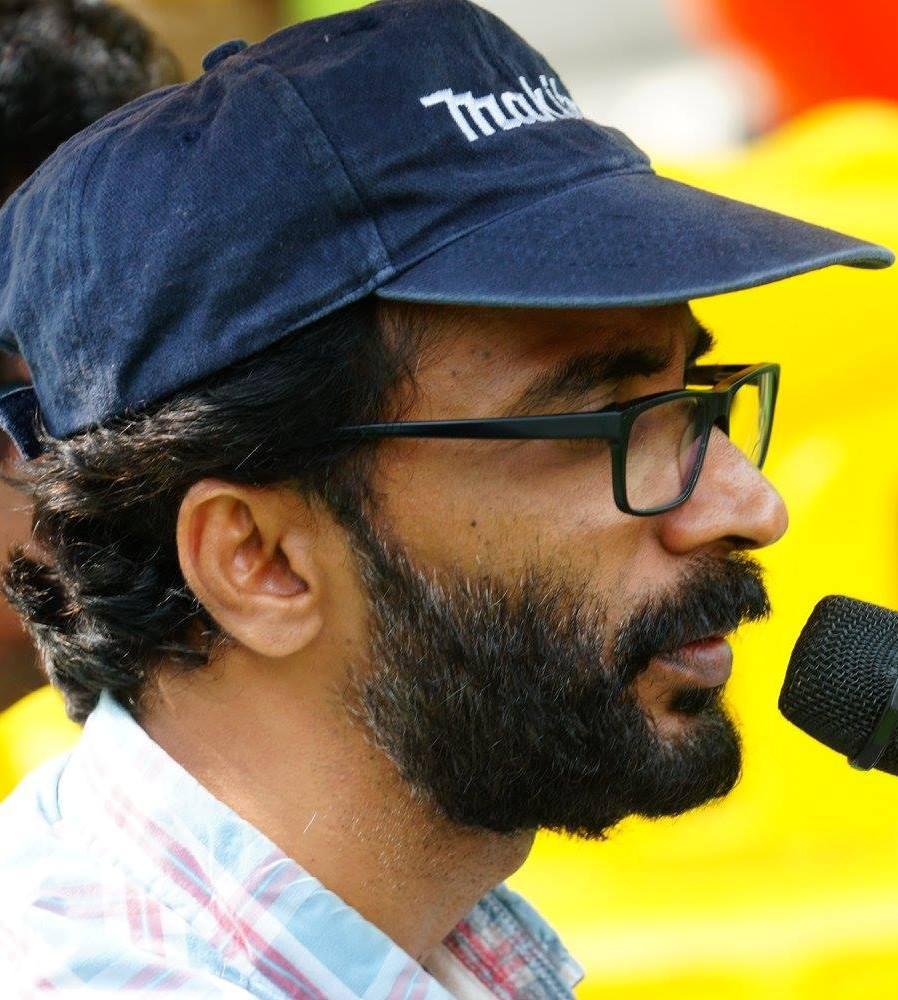
- Binoy Mathew
- Born: Binoy Mathew; 23 November 1972 (age 53); Kadampanad, Kerala, India
- Occupations: Ad Film director, screenplay writer, short story writer, cartoonist
- Spouse: Dr. Mary Binoy
- Children: Suzanne B. Mathew, Abu Binoy Mathew

Binoy Mathew (born 23 November 1972) is an Indian ad filmmaker. He has directed advertising commercials for various brands in India.

== Early life and education ==
Binoy was born in the village of Kadampanad, Kerala. He studied at Infant Jesus School, Thuvayoor, Boys High School, Kadampanad, Devasom Board College, Sasthamcotta (Bsc, Physics) and Rourkela Institute of management Studies (MBA). He gained experience in advertising and marketing while working with Sintex Industries Ltd., MK Electric Ltd., Schneider Electric Ltd., WaterMelon Studios Private Ltd. and Magiclite Productions.

== Career ==
Binoy started directing commercials with the IDCB Vanitha Easy Loan campaign and has worked on various brands He also directed two animated shorts titled The Stealth and Walk and Talk. The Stealth was selected for the prestigious Athens Anim Fest 2009. The premiere of the short film Walk and Talk took place at The Third International Documentary and Short Film Festival of Kerala (idsffk), 2010, in the competition section of animation films.
