= Viktor, a Steampunk Adventure =

2017 video game

- Developer: Studio Spektar
- Publisher: Studio Spektar
- Platform: Microsoft Windows
- Release: Microsoft Windows: NA: 3 March 2017
- Genre: Point-and-click adventure
- Mode: Single-player

Viktor, a Steampunk Adventure is a point n' click adventure game developed by Zagreb-based Studio Spektar. It boasts a cartoony steampunk setting placed in an imagined version of Agram, Austria-Hungary where characters are replaced by animals. The adventure follows Viktor, a boar disillusioned with his role as a janitor, and sets on a journey to become the next Emperor of Austria-Hungary. It was first released on Steam in March, 2017.

== Gameplay ==
The game's core follows the classic point n' click adventure formula, but with some innovations on its own. For instance, the game is notable for its use of gibberish in recorded dialogue, which is supplemented with subtitles in English. It also uses records as collectibles, which could be used to change the game's musical backdrop. The entire game is littered with minigames often utilizing arcade instances and reflexes.

== Development ==
The game went through an unsuccessful Kickstarter campaign, but was developed despite this due to the investment and passion of the developers in the project. One of the developers explained the process for choosing the setting as "When we decided to fragment the game in multiple episodes, it was logical that Viktor starts in Zagreb, or Agram in Austria-Hungary, which is in Sven’s world an industrial zone in the style of early twentieth century, only with more robots and mobile phones, rather than cockroaches".
