= Theodore Judson =

American writer (born 1951)

- Born: December 19, 1951; United States
- Education: University of Wyoming
- Occupation: Writer
- Writing career
- Language: English
- Genre: Science fiction
- Notable works: Tom Wedderburn's Life, Fitzpatrick's War, The Martian General's Daughter, The Sultan's Emissary, The Thief Catcher, Hell Can Wait
- Website: theodorejudson.blogspot.nl

Theodore Judson (born December 19, 1951) is an American science fiction writer and high school teacher. He began writing after the death of his wife and he is the author of Tom Wedderburn's Life (2002), Fitzpatrick's War (2004), The Martian General's Daughter (2008), The Sultan's Emissary (2008) (a short story published in the anthology Sideways in Crime), The Thief Catcher (2008) (in Future Americas), Hell Can Wait (2010), Deadly Waters (2016) and the Timerman (2026). He grew up in a farming community in western Wyoming and graduated from the University of Wyoming.

== Sources ==
- Biographical Reference
