= Stealth (1992 video game) =

- Cover art
- Developer: Axes Art Amuse
- Publisher: Hect
- Platform: Super Famicom
- Release: JP: December 18, 1992
- Genre: Turn-based strategy
- Mode: Single-player

Stealth (ステルス, Suterusu) is a stealth video game released for the Super Famicom on December 18, 1992 by Hect, released in Japan.

== Summary ==
One of the U.S. Army soldiers have managed to shoot and kill one of the Viet Cong soldiers near the U.S. army base.

In Stealth, the player takes control of a squad of six U.S. Army soldiers in Vietnam during the Vietnam War. Gameplay is turn-based on a platoon's level, each squad member has the option to move, attack, wait, and in the case of the radio operator call in air or artillery support.

The majority of the enemy Viet Cong troops hide in the jungles and appear on the computers turn to shoot at one of your characters if they are in range. Objectives that are given out in each level are to travel to a designated site and destroy a number of missiles guarded by a few visible and fortified Viet Cong soldiers.

== Soundtrack ==
There are 14 tracks on the soundtrack for this video game. Many of them indicate an event happening in the game (heavy artillery, change of turns, aircraft) while others are the standard game over/beating the game kind of music.
