= The Wouldbegoods =

1899 novel by E. Nesbit

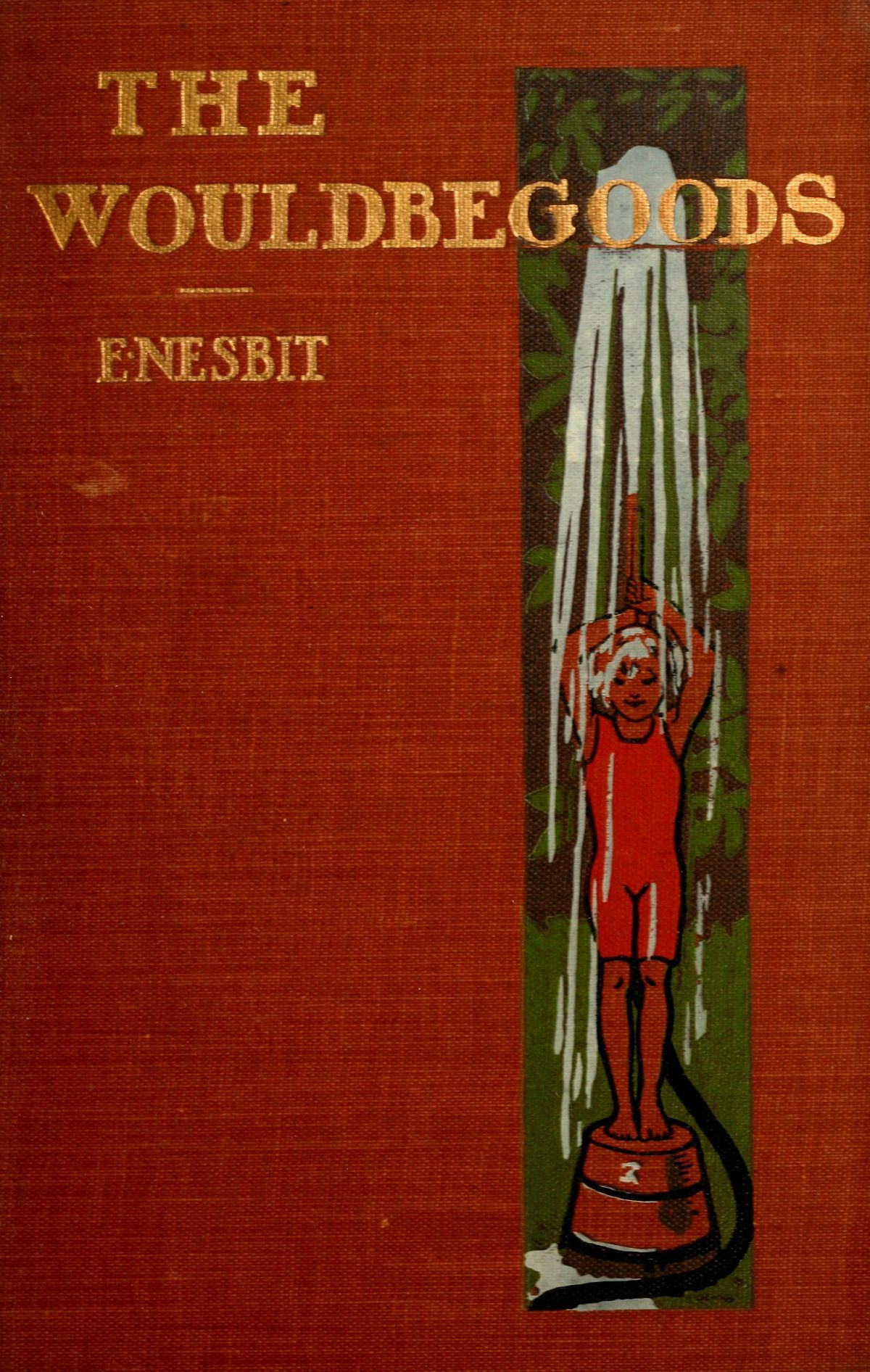
- Author: E. Nesbit
- Illustrator: Reginald B. Birch, Cecil Leslie
- Language: English
- Series: Bastable
- Genre: Children's novel
- Publisher: Harper & Brothers
- Publication date: 1901
- Publication place: United Kingdom
- Media type: Print (hardback and paperback)
- Preceded by: The Story of the Treasure Seekers
- Followed by: The New Treasure Seekers

The Wouldbegoods is a novel by E. Nesbit first published in 1901. It tells the story of Dora, Oswald, Dicky, Alice, Noel, and Horace Octavius (H. O.) Bastable, as well as Daisy and Denis Foulkes, and their attempts to perform good deeds, which usually go awry. The novel's complete name is The Wouldbegoods, Being the Further Adventures of the Treasure Seekers. The original edition included illustrations by Reginald B. Birch. The Puffin edition (1958) was illustrated by Cecil Leslie. It is a sequel to The Story of the Treasure Seekers (1899) and was followed by The New Treasure Seekers (1904).

The story is told from a child's point of view. The narrator is Oswald Bastable.

== Plot ==
While living at the Red House in Blackheath, the children decide to turn the garden into a jungle and re-enact scenes from The Jungle Book, but this causes a good deal of damage. As a consequence, the Bastable children are sent to the country to spend the summer at Moat House near Maidstone. There they attempt various good deeds, which usually backfire and lead to unintended results.

Illustrations by Reginald B. Birch

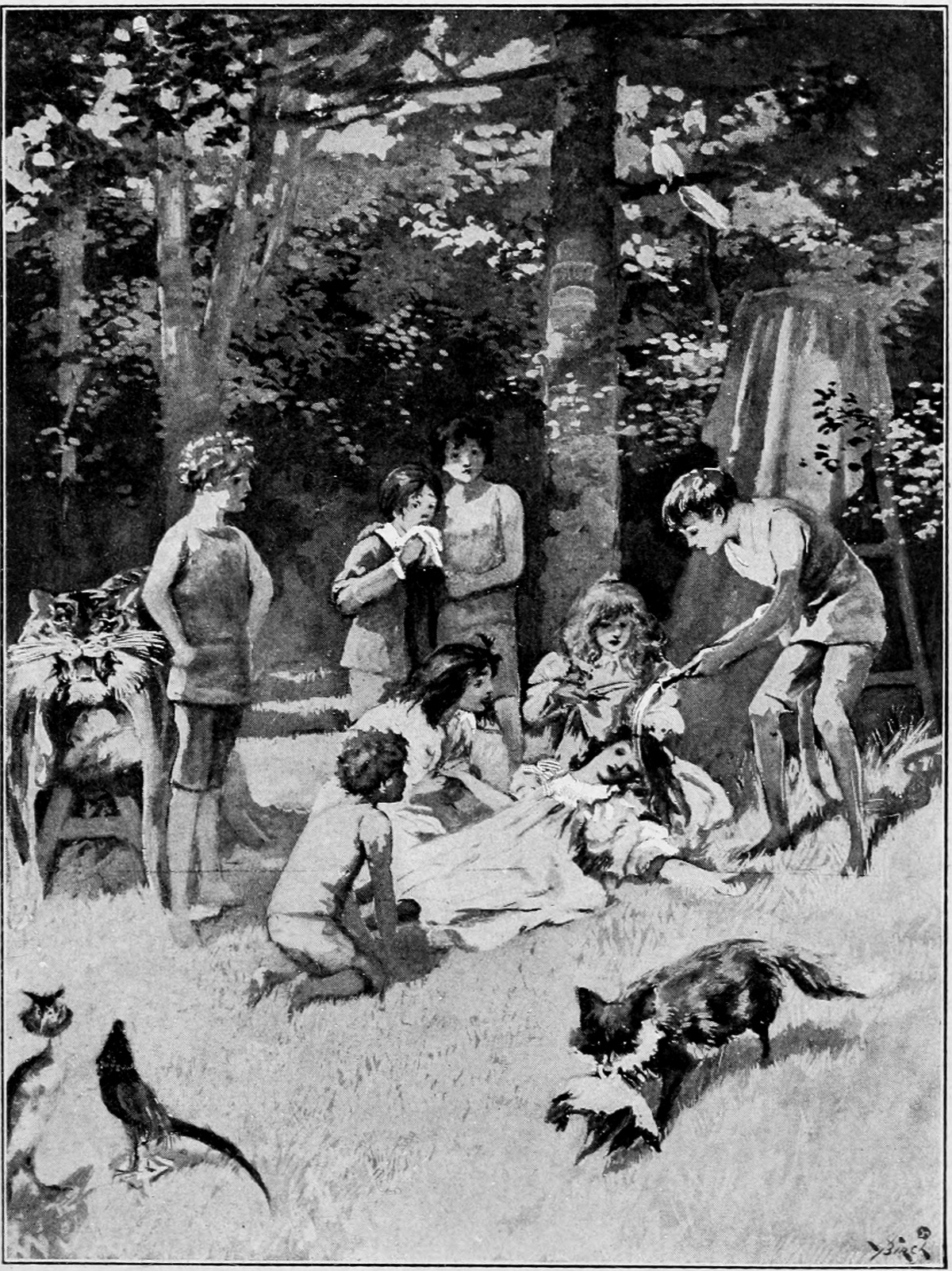

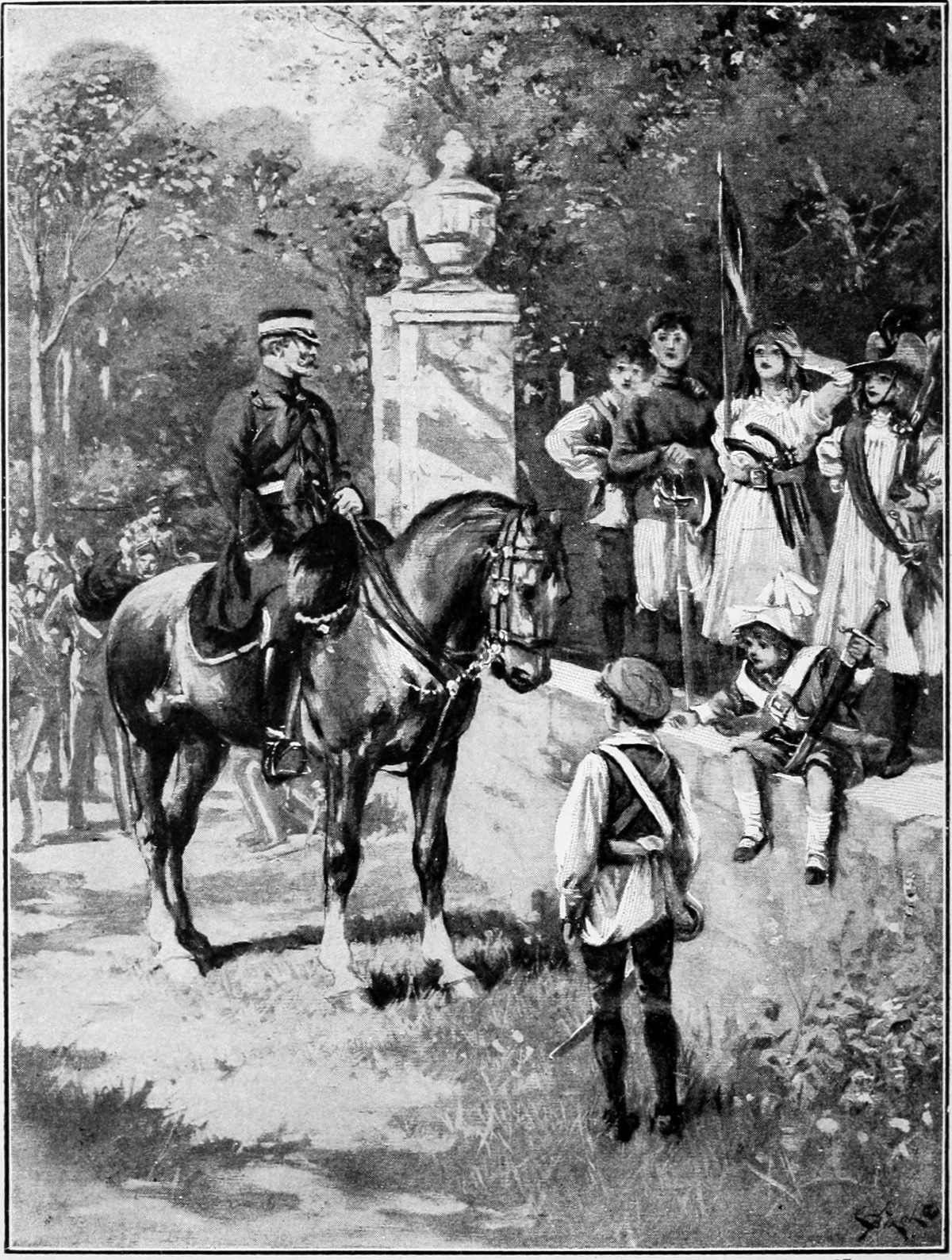

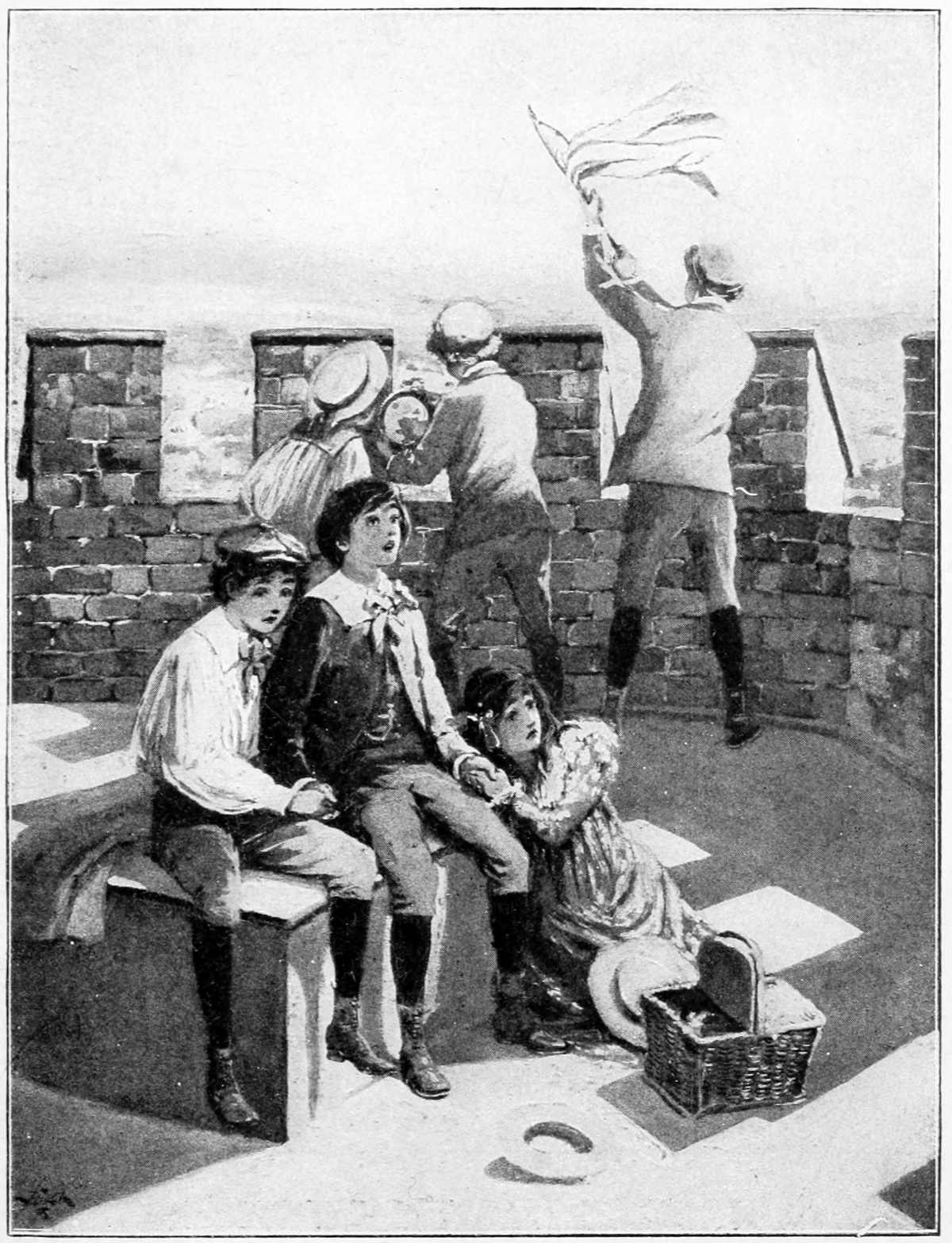

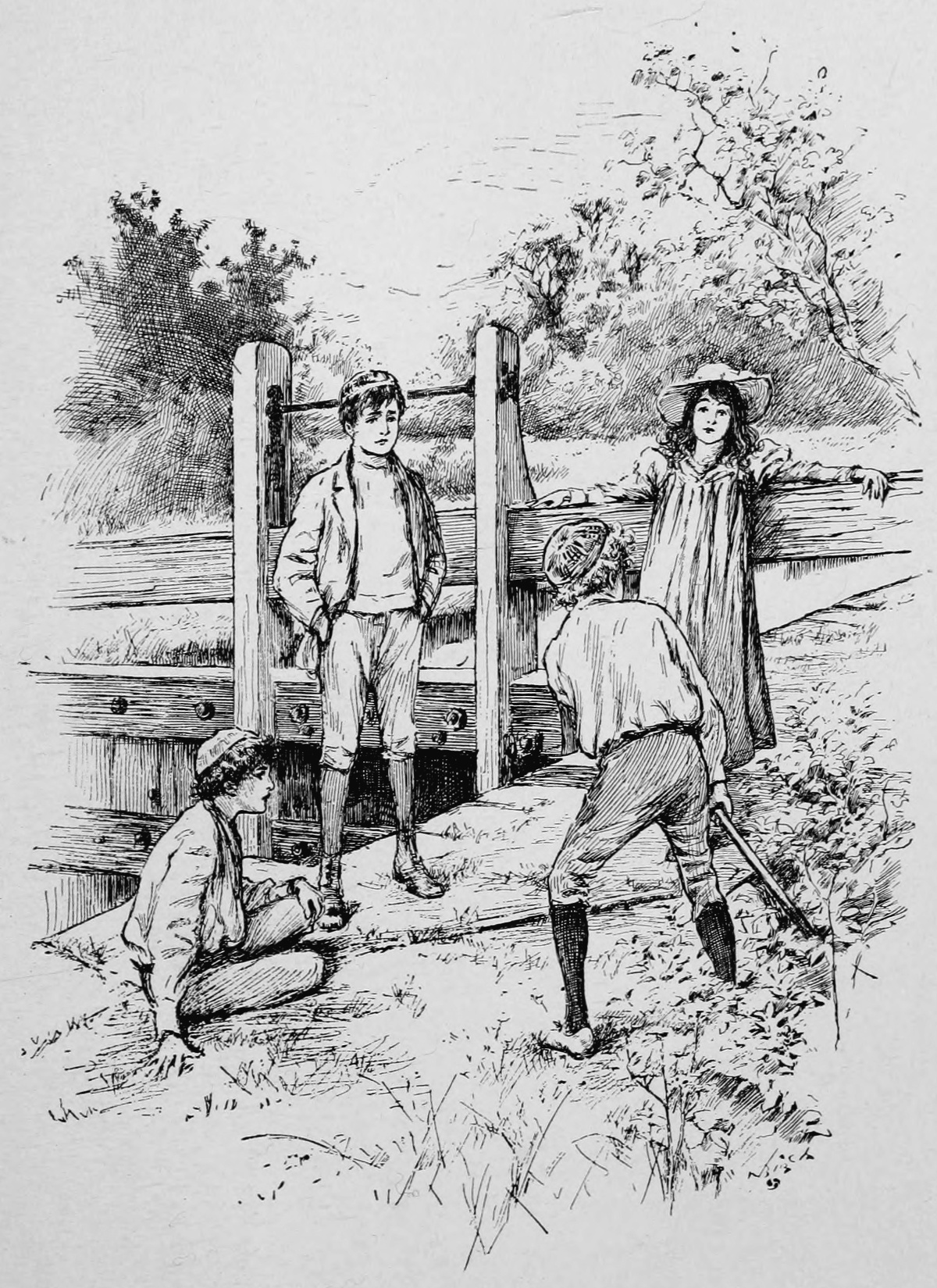

== Publication ==
The Bastable stories from The Wouldbegoods were first published between July 1900 and July 1901 in periodicals The Pall Mall Magazine and The Illustrated London News. The order in which the chapters appeared was changed for the one-volume publication in 1901. Some of them also underwent extensive rewriting.
