= Mantecoza =

- Genre: Science fiction Fantasy; Steampunk; Comedy; Adventure
- Created by: Susan Kaff
- Directed by: Susan Kaff; Kevin R. Phipps
- Starring: Toby Ambrose; Katherine Stewart; Tommy Schaeffer; Mallory Adams
- Theme music composer: The Jeff Hunt Band
- Opening theme: "Caravan"
- Original language: English
- No. of seasons: 1
- No. of episodes: 10

Production
- Executive producers: Susan Kaff; Lon Muckey
- Producers: Katherine Stewart; James Leatherman
- Production location: Phoenix, Arizona
- Editors: Dane Collier; Nick Lopez
- Camera setup: RED camera Canon T2i
- Running time: 6–11 minutes

Mantecoza is a steampunk-fantasy web series which premiered at the Phoenix ComiCon on Saturday, May 28, 2011. It centers on the character of Sebastian King, an average office worker, who is suddenly thrust into the neo-Victorian world of Mantecoza, where he struggles to learn how to be a wizard in order to fulfill his destiny. The realm of Mantecoza is presented as an alternate steampunk fantasy reality, which can be accessed by the Wizard of Mantecoza through the use of a magic ring.

== Production ==
Mantecoza initially began with several spec episodes on YouTube, the first of which featuring Sebastian King being interviewed about his opinions on Felicia Day. This episode was used primarily to demonstrate costuming and art design, as well as introduce the leads. The second spec episode introduces the Goons, minions of Lord Barr. The third is an interview with Raven, Sebastian's goth younger sister.

Most of the first season was filmed in the second half of 2010, culminating in a large crowd scene on January 30, 2011, which featured a host of local steampunk artists and vendors as featured extras.

The first official trailer for this series was premiered at the first annual Wild Wild West Con steampunk convention on March 4, 2011, and was released on YouTube on March 9, 2011. Further episodes will be released on the official website, Mantecoza.com.

== Characters ==
- Sebastian King (Toby Ambrose)

Sebastian is the bumbling, lovable, unsure of himself wizard of Mantecoza, and simple accountant on Earth. Sebastian was old before he was 12 and took on the responsibilities of ‘man of the house’ early on after his father went missing. He has always lived through his best friend Joe Kayze - his risk it all, damn the consequences friend. Sebastian is a desk jockey - making money to support his fractured family and take care of his ailing mother. All in all, Sebastian believes he is nobody of great importance, a number and a drone in this existence he calls life… until he encounters the ring.

- Lady Chenna Danbeau (Katherine Stewart)

The refined and elegant Minister of the Wizard, Lady Chenna Danbeau, is the liaison between the Ring Wizard and Mantecoza. Her father was the last “Hematological”, or natural, Wizard of Mantecoza, and creator of the Ring, and it is her duty to watch over the Wizards as they learn to wield the power imbued in the Ring.

- Joe Kayze (Tommy Schaeffer)

Joe is Sebastian’s best friend since childhood. Due to his own absent family, Joe views the King family as a surrogate, and Sebastian, Baz as he calls him, as his brother. He always looks for “the next big thing”, and to Sebastian’s wonderment, they frequently turn out successful enough that Joe meets his rent one more month.

- Joanne “Raven” King (Mallory Adams)

Raven is the younger sister of Sebastian King. She was eight when her father died and instantly resented her older brother’s assumption of the “Man of the House” mantle. As she grew into a teenager, she became obsessed with other people's things. Not that she wanted to sell them, but just to see them, or have them. She began to sneak into people’s houses when they were gone and look at the photos of happy families, taking a small thing as a memento. She developed quite a knack for ‘embracing’ others things as if they were her own… until she was caught and was forced to suppress this ‘gift.’

- Lord Barr (Vincent Maeder)

Lord Barr is the evil of Mantecoza. He is cool, calculating and determined to rule all of Mantecoza- creating it in his image. His past holds secrets that propel him into greater darkness and deception. Till now, the Ring Wizards have done little to block Lord Barr, and when they did get in the way, they were deceived into deadly mistakes. Mantecoza has not seen an evil such as him for centuries. The ring has been dangerously close to slipping onto Lord Barr’s finger and has many within the Mantecozian government nervous.

- Durrus (Marshall Glass)

Durrus is Lord Barr’s right-hand man and Chief Goon wrangler. While the Goon minions of Lord Barr are less than able, Durrus is a true villain as well as an adept and dangerous steamsaber master. Little is known of Durrus’ background. His demeanor and bearing indicate an aristocratic background, but his delight in mayhem and pain indicates a darker origin.

- Goon #1 (Chris Michael Dennis)
- Goon #2 (Will Leon)

== Awards ==
- Best Sci-Fi/Fantasy Film at 2011 Phoenix ComiCon
