= The Steel Tsar =

1981 novel by Michael Moorcock

- Cover of the first edition by Melvyn Grant.
- Author: Michael Moorcock
- Cover artist: Melvyn Grant
- Language: English
- Series: Oswald Bastable
- Genre: Science fiction novel
- Publisher: Granada
- Publication date: 1981
- Publication place: United Kingdom
- Media type: Print (paperback)
- Pages: 155 pp
- ISBN: 0-583-13432-7
- OCLC: 12404432
- Preceded by: The Land Leviathan

The Steel Tsar is a sci-fi/alternate history novel by Michael Moorcock, first published in 1981 by Granada. Being a sequel to The Warlord of the Air (1971) and The Land Leviathan (1974), it is the final part of Moorcock's A Nomad of the Time Streams trilogy regarding the adventures of Captain Oswald Bastable and which has been seen as an early example of steampunk fiction. The same cover image was used for the 1984 reissue of Judas Priest album Rocka Rolla and also the 1989 video game Ballistix.

== Plot summary ==
In a story introduced by the ubiquitous Una Persson (who is also found in other works by Moorcock), the trilogy's hero, Captain Oswald Bastable, finds himself in an alternative twentieth century in which the Confederate States of America won the American Civil War and neither the First World War nor the October Revolution ever occurred. Over the course of the story Oswald witnesses the destruction of Singapore at the hands of the Imperial Japanese Aerial Navy, is imprisoned on Rishiri Island, joins the Russian Imperial Airship Navy and is sent to put down the rebellious Cossacks who follow the theocratic demagogue known as the 'Steel Tsar': Iosif Djugashvili. He also experiences a repeat of events from the first novel as he is assigned to drop an atomic bomb on the anarchist Nestor Makhno and his Black Army, but ultimately this does not happen; the bomb is turned against the Steel Tsar's own forces and Makhno survives.

== Reception ==
David Dunham reviewed The Warlord of the Air, The Land Leviathan, and The Steel Tsar for Different Worlds magazine and stated that "Eternal Champion cycle or not, I enjoyed these stories. There were lots of subtle ironies, such as Ghandi's pacifistic republic, and the identity of the Steel Tsar himself. The alternate histories were all relevant to our own-at the root of each conflict was a struggle for freedom and justice. My biggest complaint is that they are rather short."

== Reviews ==
- Review by Faren Miller (1982) in Locus, #253 February 1982
- Review by Joseph Nicholas (1982) in Paperback Inferno, Volume 5, Number 5
- Review by Wayne Cogell (1982) in Science Fiction & Fantasy Book Review, #10, December 1982
