= Andrius Tapinas =

Lithuanian journalist (born 1977)

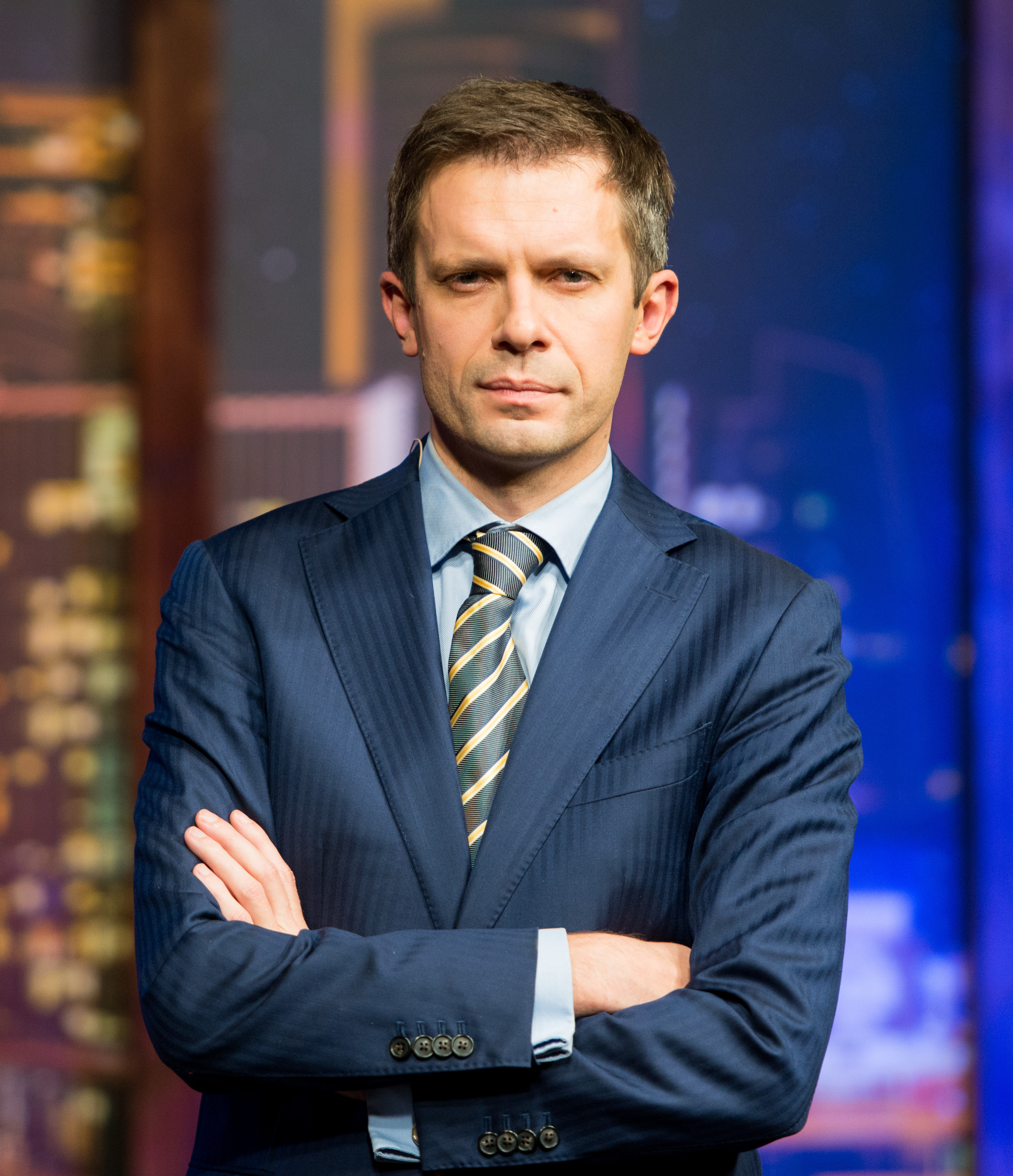
- Born: 6 April 1977 (age 49); Vilnius, Lithuanian SSR, Soviet Union
- Occupations: Writer, TV producer, presenter
- Writing career
- Genres: Science fiction, Historical fiction, Steampunk
- Notable works: Pinigų karta, Auksinis protas
- Website: www.tapinas.lt/blog

Andrius Balys Tapinas (born 6 April 1977) is a Lithuanian journalist, TV anchor, and writer. Tapinas was the anchor and producer of a long-running popular Lithuanian TV program The Money Generation. Since 2014, he hosts the Lithuanian TV program The Golden Mind with Arūnas Valinskas. In 2016, he also launched his own online TV channel on YouTube called "Freedom TV", which has proven to be a great success. Along with the "Freedom Group", Andrius has completed multiple fundraising campaigns during the COVID-19 pandemic, as well as the 2021 Lithuanian migration crisis. He hosted the "Freedom Chain" from Vilnius to the Belarus border during the 2020 Belarusian protests.

In 2023, a poll by the news portal Delfi voted that Tapinas is the most influential public figure in Lithuania.

== Early life ==
Andrius Tapinas was born in Vilnius on 6 April 1977, to Laimonas Tapinas (1944 - 2022), a writer and journalist, and Violeta Tapinienė (1944 - ), a Lithuanian language and literature teacher.

== Personal life ==
Tapinas was previously married to Rasa Tapinienė (divorced in 2019), a news anchor on LRT, and they have two children; They had a daughter, Vasara Tapinaite (born in 2002), and a son, Vakaris Tapinas (born in 2003). He married the director of Freedom TV, Gabija Milašiutė, in Nida in 2023. He is a fan of football and American football, and he supports Newcastle United.

== Bibliography ==
=== The Steam and Stone Saga ===
1. Hour of the Wolf
2. Day of the Plague
3. Hour of the Wolf. Sidabras (comic book, writer)

== Honours ==
- Lithuania: Knight Cross of the Order for Merits to Lithuania (2017)
- Ukraine: Order of Merit (2022)

== See also ==
- lt:Laikykitės ten su Andriumi Tapinu
