= The Warlord of the Air =

1971 novel by Michael Moorcock

- Cover of the first edition.
- Author: Michael Moorcock
- Cover artist: David Meltzer
- Language: English
- Series: Oswald Bastable
- Genre: Science fiction, alternate history, Steampunk
- Publisher: Ace Books
- Publication date: 1971
- Publication place: United Kingdom
- Media type: Print (paperback)
- Pages: 187 pp
- Followed by: The Land Leviathan

The Warlord of the Air is a 1971 British alternate history novel written by Michael Moorcock. It concerns the adventures of Oswald Bastable, an Edwardian era soldier stationed in India, and his adventures in an alternate universe, in his own future, wherein the First World War never happened. It is the first part of Moorcock's A Nomad of the Time Streams trilogy and, in its use of speculative technology (such as airships) juxtaposed against an Edwardian setting, it is widely considered to be one of the first steampunk novels. The novel was first published by Ace Books as part of their Ace Science Fiction Specials series.

== Plot summary ==
The novel is transcribed by 'Michael Moorcock' (the author's fictional grandfather) in 1903. Holidaying at the remote Rowe Island, he befriends Oswald Bastable, an ex-soldier stowaway who seems confused and disoriented beyond what could be explained by his opium addiction, and who is tormented by great guilt from an action he performed in his past. Bastable agrees to tell Moorcock the story, and begins his narrative with his experiences in North East India in 1902, sent as part of a British expedition to deal with Sharan Kang, an Indian high priest at the temple of Teku Benga, a mysterious and seemingly supernaturally powerful region. After a confrontation with Kang and his men, Bastable finds himself lost and alone in the caves around the 'Temple of the Future Buddha', where he is assaulted by a mysterious force and knocked into unconsciousness.

When he awakes, and escapes the caves, the Temple is in ruins, as if a great amount of time has passed. He is soon found and picked up by a massive airship, where he learns that it is in fact the year 1973, but not the one that the reader would recognise. In this alternate future, the First World War never happened, and the colonial powers continue to assert dominance over their empires—for example, India remains a British territory, though Winston Churchill had been viceroy in this alternate future as well as in Bastable's own.

At first, Bastable marvels at the wonders that await him in his 'future' — London is a clean and peaceful city, and the world seems to be a utopia, held in balance by the great empires. Gaining employment amongst the great airship armadas, however, he soon comes into contact with a troop of anarchists – among them a mysterious woman named Una Persson, and a Russian revolutionary named Ulianov. He initially maintains a patriotic resistance to their activities, but gradually discovers the truth: life is peaceful for the dominant empires but the seeming utopia of the empires' home countries is based on decades of unimpeded and unopposed colonial oppression, brutality and domination of their territories. As the First World War never happened to bankrupt the European colonial empires and begin the gradual liberalization and freedom of the colonies, imperialism remains unchecked and the world is greatly unfair and unjust. The United Kingdom, France, the Tsarist Russian Empire, the German Empire, Japan, the Italian Empire and the United States ruthlessly dominate this world and suppress anti-imperialist and anti-colonialist dissent.

Bastable, a fair and honourable man, is outraged by the cruelty, injustice and horror revealed to him, and begins to fight for the oppressed peoples of the world (opposing, amongst others, his former friend in the airship service, Major Enoch Powell). Tragically, his actions result in the atomic bombing of Hiroshima at the hands of the anarchists.

The atomic blast knocks him loose from the alternate 1973, sending him to a new 1903. Wracked with guilt over his part in the destruction of countless millions of innocent lives, and dreading the 'future' of science and imperialism gone mad, Bastable makes his way to the caves of Teku Benga and returns to 1903, but alas, not his own original time. His experiences have altered him too much to settle into life in this new alternate universe; both his experiences and this sense of dislocation have driven him to opium. The novel ends with Bastable disappearing mysteriously, much to the 1903 Moorcock's amazement; and a postscript from the modern author Moorcock, establishing his grandfather's death on the Western Front in 1916.

== Series connections ==
- This book is followed by The Land Leviathan and The Steel Tsar.
- As with many of Moorcock's other books, this book is connected to his larger 'Eternal Champion' multiverse series; as such, many frequently recurring characters / character names (including Una Persson, Major Nye and, in later editions, Count von Bek) appear in the novel.
- Oswald Bastable is a character created by author E. Nesbit for her book The Story of the Treasure Seekers.

== Genre elements ==
=== Famous personages ===
As with most alternate history novels, a variety of famous figures are mentioned and raised as being part of the fabric of the alternative society. These include:

- Winston Churchill as a former Viceroy of India;
- Enoch Powell as an airship major; in some editions the character is named "Howell".
- Mick Jagger is a well-mannered junior army officer
- Vladimir Lenin (using his real name Vladimir Ulyanov) as an aged revolutionary, the Russian Revolution having never happened;
- Leon Trotsky is mentioned by Lenin as having abandoned his revolutionary ambitions and become a "respectable" businessman;
- A Californian boy scout troop leader named Reagan (who claims to have powerful connections, partly through being a member of the Rough Riders) appears; this would seem to be a reference to then-California Governor Ronald Reagan. In early editions the character is named "Egan"
- Prominent spokesperson of the left-wing German student movement, Rudi Dutschke, appears as the Prussian nobleman-turned anarchist Count Rudolf von Dutschke. He is close friends with his mentor figure Lenin, whom he fondly relates to as "Uncle Vladimir".
- Joseph Conrad as the airship captain Joseph Korzeniowski (which was his real name).

=== Cultural allusions ===
One of the first ships Bastable flies on is called the Loch Ness. He makes a joke that it is a monster, although the term Loch Ness Monster was not coined until the 1930s.

=== The British Empire and airships ===
The assumption that survival of the British Empire as a political entity would entail survival of the airship as the main or only way of travelling by air was taken up by various other alternate British Empires fiction narratives (otherwise considerably different from each other) after Moorcock's 1971 Warlord of the Air, most notably At the Narrow Passage (1973) by Richard C. Meredith, Great Work of Time (1989) by John Crowley, The Two Georges (1995) by Harry Turtledove and Richard Dreyfuss, The Peshawar Lancers (2002) by S. M. Stirling, and Leviathan (2009) by Scott Westerfeld.

== Reception ==
David Dunham reviewed The Warlord of the Air, The Land Leviathan, and The Steel Tsar for Different Worlds magazine and stated that "Eternal Champion cycle or not, I enjoyed these stories. There were lots of subtle ironies, such as Ghandi's pacifistic republic, and the identity of the Steel Tsar himself. The alternate histories were all relevant to our own-at the root of each conflict was a struggle for freedom and justice. My biggest complaint is that they are rather short."

== Reviews ==
- Review by David Sutton (1971) in Shadow, December 1971
- Review by John Bowles (1972) in Vector 59 Spring 1972
- Review [French] by George W. Barlow (1976) in Fiction, #274
- Review by Joseph Nicholas (1981) in Paperback Inferno, Volume 5, Number 1
- Review [French] by Bruno Peeters (1996) in Phénix, #40

== See also ==
- Jerry Cornelius
- Eternal Champion
