= NGC 6572 =

Young planetary nebula in the constellation of Ophiuchus

Emission nebula
- Planetary nebula
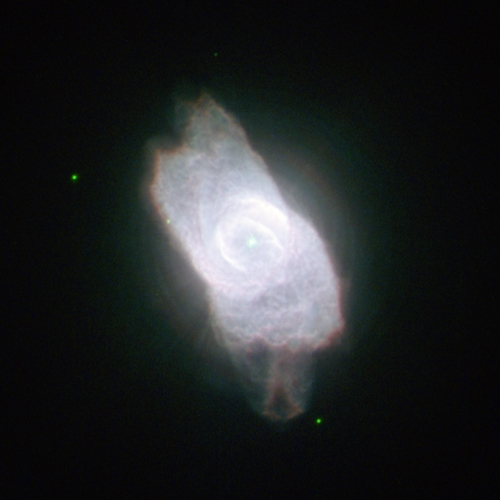
- Hubble Space Telescope image of NGC 6572; Credit: ESA/Hubble and NASA.

Observation data: J2000 epoch
- Right ascension: 18^{h} 12^{m} 06^{s}
- Declination: +06° 51′ 13″
- Distance: 6,030 ly (1,850 pc)
- Apparent magnitude (V): 9. p
- Apparent dimensions (V): 0.1 arc min
- Constellation: Ophiuchus

Physical characteristics
- Radius: 0.05 ly
- Designations: IRAS 18096+0650, PK 034+11 1, PN VV' 370, AG+06 2201, JCMTSE J181206.2+065114, PLX 4174.00, PPM 165362, BD+06 3649, JCMTSF J181206.2+065114, PLX 4174, RAFGL 5206S, EM* CDS 964, 2MASX J18120627+0651129, PN ARO 7, SCM 192, GCRV 10650, NSV 24329, PN G034.6+11.8, WB 1809+0650, HD 166802, NVSS J181206+065112, PN VV 159.

NGC 6572 is a planetary nebula in the constellation Ophiuchus. It was discovered in 1825 by the German astronomer Friedrich Georg Wilhelm von Struve. According to several sources such as Sky & Telescope, this object received the nicknames Blue Racquetball, Emerald Nebula, Emerald Eye Nebula, Planet Krypton Nebula, Green Nebula, and Turquoise Orb. At magnitude 8.1, NGC 6572 is easily bright enough to make it an appealing target for amateur astronomers with telescopes. At low magnification, it will appear to be just a colored star, but higher magnification will reveal its shape.

NGC 6572 is a relatively young nebula, and began to shed its gases a few thousand years ago. Because of this, the material is still quite concentrated, which explains its abnormal brightness. The envelope of gas is currently racing out into space at a speed of around 15 kilometres per second. As it becomes more diffuse, it will dim. Its structure consists of two bipolar shells that are slightly misaligned from each other's axes, as well as a toroidal waist.

The central star of the planetary nebula has a spectral type of Of-WR(H). The central star has an effective temperature of 68,000 K and a luminosity about 5,700 times that of the Sun.
