= Airrow A-8S Stealth =

- Type: Air rifle

Production history
- Designed: 1989
- Manufacturer: Swivel Machine

Specifications
- Cartridge: .177/.22/.25 calibre pellets Capable of launching darts
- Caliber: .177.22.25
- Barrels: 1

The Airrow Stealth is a pneumatic air rifle manufactured by Swivel Machine. It is chambered in calibres ranging from .177/.22/.25 and capable of firing the likes of darts at a high speed.
