= The Court of the Air =

2007 novel by Stephen Hunt

- First edition
- Author: Stephen Hunt
- Cover artist: Max Schindler
- Language: English
- Series: Jackelian series
- Genre: Fantasy, Steampunk
- Publisher: Voyager Books
- Publication date: 2007
- Publication place: United States
- Media type: Paperback
- Pages: 592
- ISBN: 0-00-723218-7
- OCLC: 76797890
- Followed by: The Kingdom Beyond the Waves

The Court of the Air is the first book by Stephen Hunt in his Jackelian series. The plot is set in a steampunk world that mixes historical events or social concepts of the real world with elements of fantasy novels, such as sorcery and superpowers.

== Plot summary ==
When streetwise Molly Templar witnesses a brutal murder at the brothel she has recently been apprenticed to, her first instinct is to run back to the poorhouse where she grew up. But there she finds her fellow orphans butchered, and it slowly dawns on her that she was the real target of the attack. For Molly is special, and she is carrying a secret that marks her out for destruction by enemies of the state.

Oliver Brooks has led a sheltered existence in the backwater home of his merchant uncle. But when he is framed for his only relative's murder, he is forced to flee for his life, accompanied by an agent of the mysterious Court of the Air. Chased across the country, Oliver finds himself in the company of thieves, outlaws, and spies, and gradually learns more about the secret that has blighted his life.

Soon Molly and Oliver will find themselves battling a grave threat to civilization, an ancient power thought to have been quelled millennia ago. Their enemies are ruthless and myriad, but the two orphans are also aided by indomitable friends.

== Reception ==
Critics compare the book to those of Susanna Clarke and Philip Pullman.
