= Fitzpatrick's War =

2004 novel by Theodore Judson

- Author: Theodore Judson
- Language: English
- Genre: Science fiction, post-apocalyptic fiction
- Publisher: Daw Books
- Publication date: 2004
- Publication place: United States
- Media type: Print (Hardcover, Paperback)
- ISBN: 0-7564-0196-8
- OCLC: 56069814
- Dewey Decimal: 813/.6 22
- LC Class: PS3610.U533 F58 2004
- Preceded by: Tri Ogalala
- Followed by: The Timerman

Fitzpatrick's War is a work of post-apocalyptic fiction by American science fiction writer Theodore Judson. It was first published by DAW Books in 2004.

== Plot introduction ==
The novel takes the form of an autobiography by a twenty-fifth century soldier, Brigadier General Sir Robert Mayfair Bruce, of the Yukon Confederacy, as edited by a prudish, bigoted academic of the twenty-sixth century, Professor Roland Modesty Van Buren. Bruce's story chronicles (and criticizes) the career of Lord Isaac Prophet Fitzpatrick, a consul of the fictional Yukon Confederacy whose life closely parallels that of Alexander the Great. This unique style allows the reader to simultaneously learn the "official history" of Fitzpatrick as well as the revisionist version of Bruce's work.

== Plot ==
=== Backstory ===
The history of Judson's world is revealed in the form of an oral history exam given to cadets at the Yukon War College, in addition to various footnotes and references in the text. In the mid twenty-first century, civil order began to break down in the United States and elsewhere in North America and Europe through the rise of many rival factions and gangs. One such group, the "New Agrarians", became the primary source of agricultural products as market conditions rendered investment in farming unprofitable. Derided by urban elites as hicks, they were called "Yukons" because of the remoteness of that Canadian territory, a name which they eventually adopted for themselves. Nonetheless, the Yukons developed a high degree of competence in biological and genetic sciences. At the same time the Timermen, their hidden technological elite, began developing means of rendering their enemies' electronic technology unusable through development of portable electromagnetic pulse generation technology. In the 2070s and 2080s, a gang known as the Yellowjackets, under the control of a lawyer named Bartholemew Iz, seized control of the United States and launched a campaign of biological warfare the goals of which are left unclear but which killed hundreds of millions of people worldwide. In 2081 war broke out between the Yellowjackets and the Yukons. The Timerman activated their electronic-inhibiting "Storm Machines" and in the ensuing chaos (known as the "Storm Times") took control of much of North America. Over the next several decades global civilization largely collapsed, leading to plagues, famine, and many local wars which killed additional hundreds of millions. The industrialized world had its population reduced to a fraction of what it once was. Muslim invaders seized Continental Europe, Northern Africa and Central Asia, while simultaneously China took over much of East Asia. The Yukons resettled Iceland, Greenland, Australia and the British Isles (after they were retaken from Muslim forces). Numerous wars with foreign powers and nations have left the Yukons a hyper-militarized society, with all men serving in the military for at least some time.

=== Judson's world at the beginning of Fitzpatrick's War ===
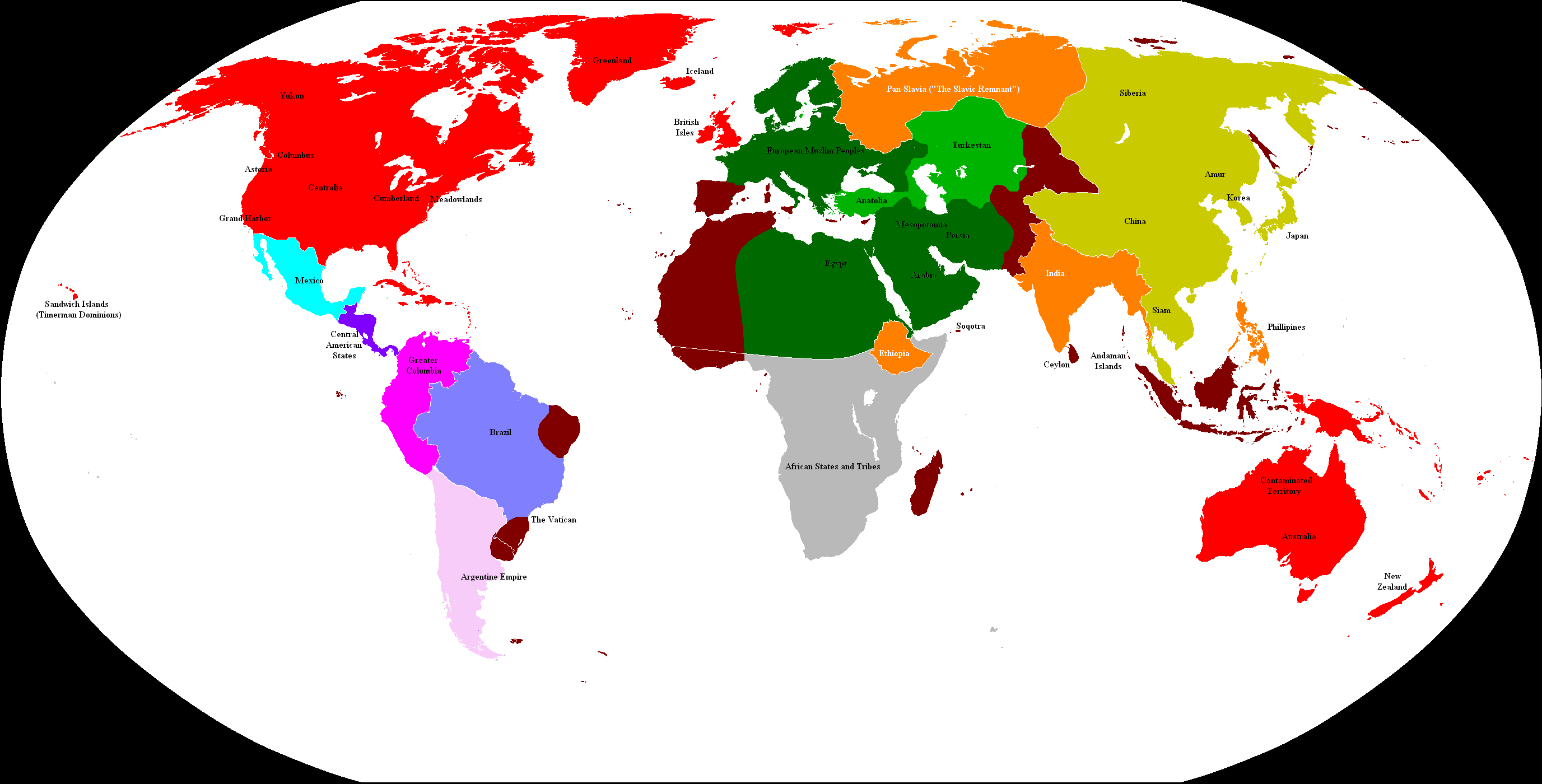
Map of the world in 2415, at the beginning of the novel, showing territories won by the Yukon Confederacy (in dark red) and rebelling against the Turkish Sultanate (dark green).

At the time the book begins in 2415, the Yukon Confederacy controls North America, Australasia, Britain, Iceland and Greenland. A Turkish empire controls the Muslim world, including Europe, Central Asia, Afghanistan and Pakistan; since it is based at Tashkent, "Turkish" here may be used in the generic sense. A totalitarian (and apparently still Communist) China rules virtually all of East Asia, including Siberia, Korea, and Japan. India, Ethiopia, the Philippines and a much-truncated Russia (called "Pan-Slavia" or the "Slavic Remnant") remain independent and allied with the Yukons, while Africa is divided among numerous feuding states variously supported by the Yukons, the Turks and the Chinese. Finally, Latin America is a collection of banana republics; among others, Judson lists a bandit-plagued Mexico, Brazil (since the Muslim conquest of Europe, the home of the Pope), Greater Colombia, and the Argentine Empire.

The Yukon Confederacy of Judson's book is a neo-feudal, clan based society. Its social mores are reminiscent of Victorian Age England (with the national flag being the Union Jack), with strong echoes of the Puritan settlers of New England. The economy of the Yukon Confederacy is almost entirely based on feudal agriculture, though there is some light industry devoted entirely to military production. The technology is steam-based, though far in advance of the technology of the Industrial Age (approximately equivalent to technology from the 1950s), with great advances in chemicals and biological engineering over modern-day science. The Confederacy is governed by provincial Lords, who are theoretically elected to serve in the Senate in Cumberland, their capital city, but in practice often pass their position to their children. The highest post is held by the Consul. The dominant and official religion is the Unified Yukon Church, a Protestant denomination; Catholic, Jewish and various Evangelical denominations exist as barely tolerated minorities.

The flag of the Yukon Confederacy.

Thanks to a series of laws regarding inheritance, the Yukon population has remained stable at about 30 million people for several centuries. Additionally, it is implied that the Yukon population is entirely white, and that the Yukons exterminated or deported all other ethnic groups that lived in the Confederacy. The evidence for this can be found in Doctor Murrey's discussions with Bruce (which see below), the racism of Judson's characters, and the fact that many American cities that had Spanish or Native American names are given new Anglo-Saxon or Latin names by the Yukons. For example, San Francisco was renamed "Grand Harbor", the Rio Grande River is "Grand River", and Kansas City was rebuilt as "Centralia"; by contrast, Oakland and Salt Lake City retained their names. Non-white characters exist only at the fringes of society, as merchant mariners or as bandits in the Southwest referred to as "Latin hordes". Most of the Yukon characters see foreigners, even the Yukons' Slavic, African and Indian allies, as little better than savages. While knowledge of Latin and Greek is standard among the educated, other languages are almost completely absent among the Yukon. The Timermen are a mystery even to other Yukoners, other than that they have a base on the Sandwich Islands, the only place on earth immune to their EMP-producing satellites.

=== The story ===
While a student at the Yukon War College, Robert Mayfair Bruce, decorated veteran of the Mexican War of 2412, is selected by Isaac Prophet Fitzpatrick (Fitzpatrick the Younger) to join his inner circle. Fitzpatrick, son of Consul Coronet Fitzpatrick, has assembled around him a group of men, each with unique talents or connections that will aid him when he (presumably) takes over his father's position. These men call themselves the basileis, or the "kings of men". During his time as a student, Bruce also makes the acquaintance of Doctor Jonathan Nehemiah Murrey, ostensibly a professor of history, and an Irish Traveller girl named Charlotte Raft. Murrey is revealed to be a high-ranking Timerman.

Upon graduation Bruce is dispatched to India, where he works with a group of engineers constructing illegal airfields at the direction of Fitzpatrick the Younger. When the elder Fitzpatrick is killed under mysterious circumstances and his son is acclaimed the new Consul, it becomes clear that Isaac Fitzpatrick intends to use Bruce's work and the talents of the other basileis to conquer the world and create a universal, global society. Bruce is recalled to North America to take a bride from Fitzpatrick's mother's finishing school. To his surprise he is paired with Charlotte, whom Dr. Murrey has maneuvered into the position for reasons of his own. Despite the circumstances of their pairing they remain deeply in love for the rest of their lives.

Returning to India with Charlotte, Bruce begins preparing for war. Meanwhile, Fitzpatrick subdues the nations of the Western Hemisphere and much of Africa, forcing them to sign the "Four Points Agreement" surrendering much of their independence to the Yukon Confederacy. Finally Fitzpatrick demands the obeisance of the Turks and Chinese, and war on an unprecedented scale is declared and fought. Millions of Chinese soldiers are killed in an attack on Yukon forces in India while, to Bruce's horror, swarms of genetically engineered locusts are dropped on agricultural regions of China, causing a famine which kills hundreds of millions more. At the end of a few months the Yukons control most of the world. The defeated enemies and the Yukons' Indian and Slavic allies are all forced to sign the Four Points Agreement.

Fitzpatrick, beset on all sides by palace intrigues, becomes increasingly paranoid. When one of his generals, Field Marshal Hood, retires to a village in China to try and remedy some of the harm he has caused, Fitzpatrick has him assassinated. Shortly thereafter an attempted coup by some of Fitzpatrick's most trusted friends (and his mother) is put down, but the Consul himself is left at the brink of madness and is nursed back to a semblance of health only by the efforts of Bruce, who by this time has become disillusioned with the ever-growing megalomania of his liege lord.

Finally, Bruce finds himself manipulated into assassinating Fitzpatrick by the devious Murrey and his Timermen comrades, who threaten his family with death. After Bruce succeeds (with help from Pularski, Fitzpatrick's bodyguard) in blowing up Fitzpatrick's court, Bruce flees with a few survivors for Australia, where he is met by Dr. Murrey. Murrey reveals the secret of the Timermen to Bruce. He explains that all societies experience a heroic age, an age of imperial might and an age of decline. The Timermen's actions, going back to the Storm Times centuries before, are engineered to keep the Yukons in a perpetual heroic age and avoid what they view as the decline of civilization that occurred during the early and mid 21st century. To achieve this end, they will continually promote the rise of a Yukon empire and then bring it crashing down through internal discontent, until the time when the rest of the world had been reduced to Stone Age conditions. At which point they may allow a return to the electrical age.

Following the Consul's death, his capital at Samarkand is sacked. Pan-Slavic workers who had been brought in to settle and build the city are forced to fight their way home, in an episode reminiscent of the march of the Ten Thousand described by Xenophon.

Fitzpatrick's in-laws, the Shay family, seize power and usher in a financially and morally corrupt regime that is ultimately overthrown in a coup (in which Bruce himself participates). Bruce then retires to an estate in Astoria, a village in modern-day Oregon. Yukon society has now largely rejected the universalism of Fitzpatrick's vision in favor of parochial isolationism, fulfilling Murray and the Timermen's vision.

The book concludes with the historian Van Buren's endnotes condemning Bruce as a liar and promoting the official version of history that is so drastically at odds with Bruce's account.
