= Hour of the Wolf (novel) =

2013 novel written by Andrius Tapinas

- First edition
- Author: Andrius Tapinas
- Original title: Vilko valanda
- Translator: Andrius Tapinas
- Illustrator: Antanas Marcelionis
- Language: Lithuanian (hardcover); English (e-book)
- Series: Steam and Stone Saga
- Genre: Steampunk, historical fiction
- Publisher: Alma Littera (hardcover); Self-publishing (e-book)
- Publication date: February 16, 2013
- Publication place: Lithuania
- English publication date: September 3, 2013
- Media type: Hardcover (Lithuanian); E-book (English)
- Pages: 532 (hardcover); 487 (Kindle Edition)
- ISBN: 978-609-01-0890-1
- Followed by: Day of the Plague

Hour of the Wolf (Lithuanian: Vilko valanda) is a steampunk novel written by Andrius Tapinas. It was released in February 2013 in Lithuania as a hardcover book. Hour of the Wolf was the first steampunk book written in Lithuanian and spent 20 weeks in the Top 10 of the best-selling fiction books in Lithuania. The novel was swiftly translated to English and was released on Amazon as e-book on September 3, 2013.

The first of a young adult fiction tetralogy, it is set in an alternative version of the beginning of the 20th century in Vilnius, Lithuania and other cities across Europe. The powerful family of bankers, the Rothchilds, has created the Alliance of Free Cities, where alchemists pilot steampunk airships over great cities, hard working mechanics create automatons and deep in the dungeons secret societies of macabre wizards strive to create artificial intelligence. The main character is a former US Marine Antanas Sidabras, legate of the Free City of Vilnius, whose investigation of, at first look, just another murder turns out to be a complex web of political intrigue, and he has everybody against him – mad doctors, corrupt officials, Russian agents and monsters from his personal nightmares.

A sequel, Day of the Plague, has been published in Lithuania.

== Plot summary ==
In 1870, the Russian Empire is in huge debt to the Rothschild family. Grand Duke Konstantin Nikolayevich together with Empire's ministers and secretary are discussing the future of the empire. To be more precise, they are discussing country's deficit. The Rothschilds have proposed to exchange Vilnius and Reval for the writing off all debt of the Russian Empire and the guarantee of zero per cent interest on all credit for the following 30 years.

In 1905, 35 years after the deal between Russian Empire and Rothschilds was made, Vilnius belongs to the Alliance of the Free Cities, together with four other cities, Reval, Kraków, Prague and part of Constantinople. Few days away from The Summit, a simple, at first sight, murder in the old graveyard turns out to be a complex web of political intrigue. The main character Antanas Sidabras, legate of the free city of Vilnius, during the investigation gets to travel to Novovileisk with the hot air balloon, go to the dungeons of the city, play spy games with the Russians and manages to calm down the Russian agents provoked riots.

In Novovileisk, Sidabras finds out that Vitamancers kept crazy scientist, who knew how to create the bionic - half automaton half living organism, long thought to be impossible to create, but appears that the bionic wolf was the perpetrator that did the killing in the graveyard. When legate finds out the truth about bionic wolf it is too late to stop it from start the killings - it gets unleashed. Legate and his legionnaires tries to do everything, but nothing they do can stop it. Then suddenly Jonas Basanavicius comes to help with his flying Dragon Fly, a colossal glider, with the heavy machinery attached to its nose. Only then they manage to kill the bionic wolf, but during the fight Mila, Nikodemas Tvardauskis' foster-daughter, gets killed by the wolf.

In the last scene of the book, it is revealed that the Efraim, old Jew, who is believed to be just a shoe mender, truly is the head of the Rothschild dynasty.

== Adaptations ==
The novel was the basis for a video game entitled The Howler developed by Antanas Marcelionis.
