= G. D. Falksen =

American writer

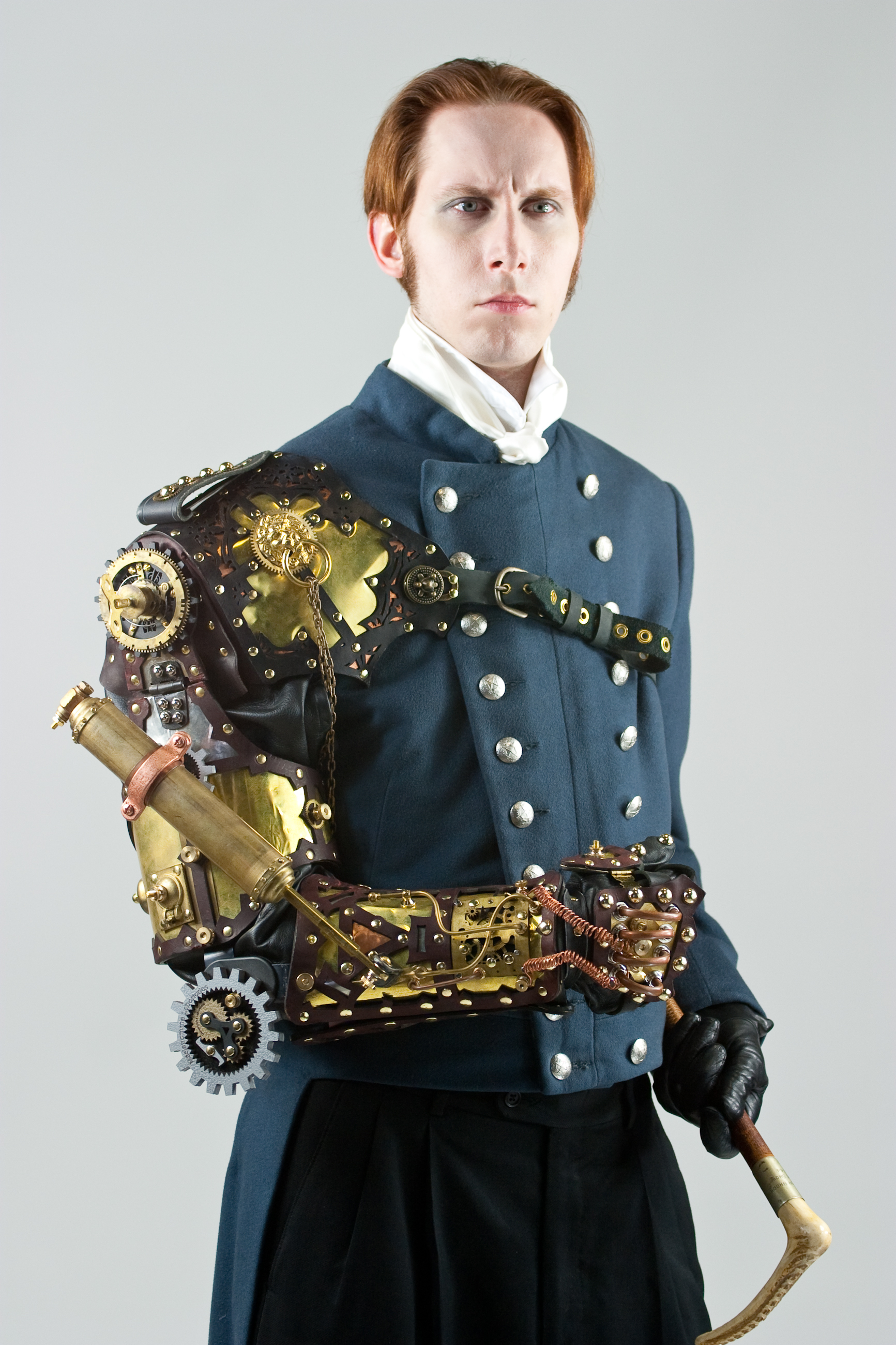
- G. D. Falksen in steampunk attire, including a mechanical arm wearable sculpture by Thomas Willeford, utilizing a complex clockwork series of gears
- Born: Arlington, Virginia, U.S.
- Occupation: Writer
- Writing career
- Genres: Science fiction, pulp adventure, horror fiction, historical fiction, fantasy
- Notable work: The Strange Case of Mr. Salad Monday
- Website: gdfalksen.com

Geoffrey D. Falksen is an American steampunk writer.

== Career ==
Falksen's work includes several short stories set in his "Cities of Ether" setting, as well as the adventure stories "An Unfortunate Engagement" and "The Mask of Tezcatlipoca," featured in Steampunk Tales. His work has also appeared in the Footprints and Steampunk Reloaded anthologies. His debut novel, Blood in the Skies, was published by Wildside Press in July 2011; it was the first in a planned series entitled The Hellfire Chronicles, and was accompanied by a concurrently released soundtrack consisting of music from various steampunk artists.

He writes a blog for science fiction website Tor.com on various topics including reviews, social issues, and current events. He has also written essays for the programs of several steampunk-themed events, including the Steampunk Art Exhibition at the Museum of the History of Science at Oxford and the Nova Albion Steampunk Exhibition. The Chap magazine dubbed him "America's authority on the movement" in one of their discussions of steampunk, Marie Claire Italia described him as "a specialist in this field," and Paper magazine has called him "the unofficial face of Steampunk." His opinions on the genre are frequently quoted in discussions of steampunk in a variety of publications such as CRN, Bizarre Mag, and local-interest sites.

== Bibliography ==
=== The Ouroboros Cycle ===
1. The Ouroboros Cycle Book One: A Monster’s Coming-Of-Age Story (2013)
2. The Ouroboros Cycle Book Two: A Cautionary Tale for Young Vampires (2014)
3. The Ouroboros Cycle Book Three: A Long Awaited Treachery (2015)
4. The Ouroboros Cycle Book Four: A Sojourn in Bohemia (2016)
5. The Ouroboros Cycle Book Five: House of the Far Earth (2017)
6. The Ouroboros Cycle Book Six: A Wilderness of Tigers (2024)

=== The Hellfire Chronicles ===
1. Blood In The Skies (2011)
2. Ash On The Wind (Forthcoming)
3. Fire In The Storm (Forthcoming)

=== The Cities of Ether ===
- "Sofia Athanatos" (The Willows Magazine, November 2007)
- "The Strange Case of the All-Seeing Ear" ([], serialized 2007-2008)
- "The Strange Case of Mr. Salad Monday " (Tor.com, October 2009); reprinted in Steampunk II: Steampunk Reloaded (ed. Ann VanderMeer and Jeff VanderMeer, Tachyon Publications, November 2010)
- "Cinema U" in The Immersion Book of Steampunk (ed. Gareth Jones and Carmelo Rafalà, Immersion Press; August 2011)

=== Serials and short fiction ===
- "An Unfortunate Engagement" Parts 1-4 in Steampunk Magazine (2007–2008)
- "An Unfortunate Engagement" Parts 5-9 in Steampunk Tales (2009–2012)
- "The Mask of Tezcatlipoca" Parts 1-5 in Steampunk Tales (2009–2012)
- "In the Footsteps of Giants" in "Footprints" (ed. Jay Lake and Eric T. Reynolds, Hadley Rille Books, July 2009) (ISBN 0981924395)

=== Nonfiction ===
- "Steampunk Fashion" (EgoPHobia #21, 2008)
- "The Rules Of Steampunk Style" (The Chap Issue 43, February 2009)
- “Steampunk 101” (Tor.com, October 2009); reprinted in The Art of Steampunk (Art Donovan, Fox Chapel Publishing, August 2011) (ISBN 1565235738)
- "The world is not enough...but it is such a perfect place to start " (Tor.com, October 2009)
- "The Steampunk Cold War" (Tor.com, October 2009)
- "The Steampunk Office" (Tor.com, October 2009)
- "Spy-fi is just around the corner" (Tor.com, November 2009)
- "From Wonderland with Love: Spy-fi and Mod themes in Syfy’s Alice" (Tor.com, December 2009)
- "Steampunk and History" (Tor.com, October 2010)
- "The Tesla Tragedy" (Tor.com, October 2010)
- "The Steampunk Civil War" (Tor.com, October 2010)
- "The Nightmare of the Absurd: Terry Gilliam’s Brazil" (Tor.com, April 2011)
- Contributor to The Steampunk Bible (Jeff VanderMeer and S. J. Chambers, Abrams Image, May 2011)
