= Paul Roland =

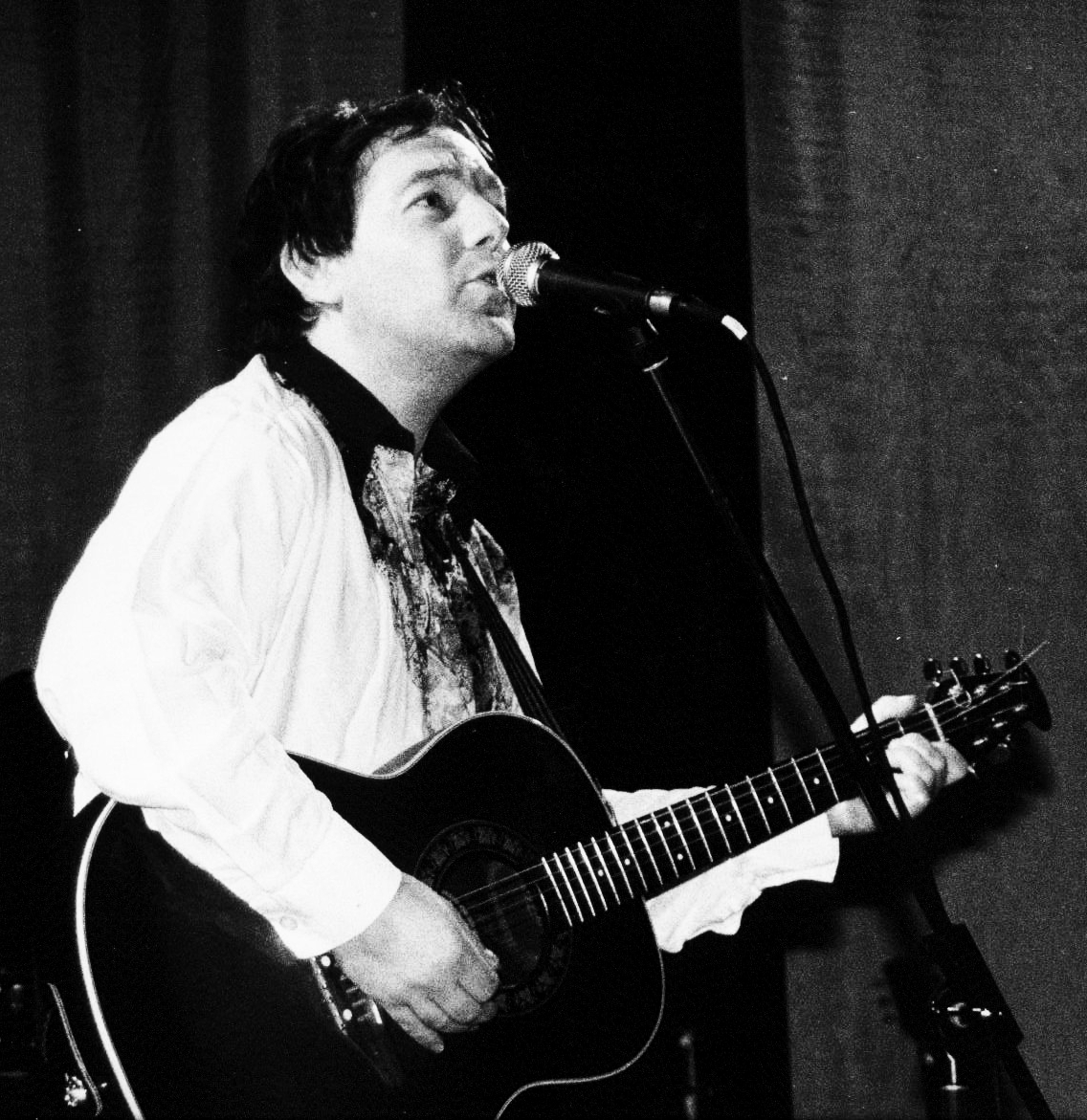
- Roland in 1995

Background information
- Born: 6 September 1959 (age 66); Kent, England
- Genres: Psychedelic pop, gothic rock
- Occupations: Singer-songwriter, author, music journalist
- Instruments: Vocals, guitar, keyboards
- Years active: 1979–present
- Website: paulroland.info

Paul Roland (born 6 September 1959) is an English singer-songwriter, author and music journalist. Roland typically writes his songs in the form of stories, often addressing historical figures, characters from literature and film, or his own creations. He has explored genres including gothic rock, psychedelic pop, folk and baroque.

Described by Music Week as a "psychedelic cult celebrity", Roland has enjoyed an underground career as opposed to mainstream success, gathering a stronger fanbase in mainland Europe than in his native UK. He has been credited with spearheading steampunk music.

Aside from his recording career, Roland has written for various music magazines, and has authored numerous books on subjects including popular music, crime, World War II, and the supernatural.

== Early life ==
Roland was born on 6 September 1959 in Kent, England. He is an only child. His father was a writer of short stories and TV comedy scripts and his mother an actress. Roland's earliest influences include the authors H. G. Wells, Edgar Allan Poe, H. P. Lovecraft and M. R. James. He also developed a love of classic horror films. Roland was "pretty much fixated" with rock musician Marc Bolan from the age of 14, and later became an adherent of composer Michael Nyman, whose work introduced him to classical musicians such as Henry Purcell and George Frideric Handel.

== Music career ==
Roland's work is generally rooted in psychedelic pop and gothic rock, with influences from folk, jazz, blues, baroque, and 1950s rock and roll. His style has been described as "idiosyncratic". Roland's songs typically present as stories, addressing historical figures, and characters from film and literature. He has also written about non-specific characters including supernatural visitors, pirates, and villainous judges. As well as being a singer, Roland plays guitar and keyboards.

Roland issued his first single, "Oscar Automobile", in 1979. In 1980 he released his debut album, The Werewolf of London (originally credited to the Midnight Rags), inspired by horror stories and Edwardian era concerns. Ian Canty of Louder Than War observed "a nice Garage Psych sound", adding that "at times this album could almost be superior New Wave pop like XTC or Magazine but it's always pulling in weirder directions". Roland was managed by David Enthoven (manager of Roxy Music) and June Bolan (widow of Marc Bolan) during the early 1980s, but was unable to secure a satisfactory record contract. In 1982 he took a hiatus from recording and focused on music journalism.

1985's Burnt Orchids was characterised by Music Week as a "pleasing early [Pink] Floydish collection"; Roland considers it his first "authentic" or "real" album. The record has been noted as a "blueprint" for 1987's Danse Macabre, an album that has garnered critical acclaim. Appraising Danse Macabre, Prog's Kris Needs referred to "horror-psych masterworks" including "Witchfinder General", "Requiem", "Twilight of the Gods" and the "hallucinogenic waft" of the title track, as well as an "uncanny" cover version of Pink Floyd's "Matilda Mother". "The Great Edwardian Air Raid" has been identified as the song that connected Roland to steampunk. A Cabinet of Curiosities (1987) and Happy Families (1988), influenced by EC Comics and H. G. Wells's writings on the Edwardian era, were more sparse, stripped-down baroque albums. The former includes a cover of The Adverts' "Gary Gilmore's Eyes".

Music & Media observed Victorian era themes throughout the "fascinating" Masque (1990), and suggested that "pop music in the Middle Ages" would have resembled 1991's Roaring Boys. Roland continued to write and record until 1997, when he halted his music career for seven years. This was due to the collapse of several record labels to which he was signed. During this hiatus he concentrated on his writing career and raising his children. Roland said of this period, "I didn't play the guitar at all and I didn't listen to my own music. I had to pretend it had never happened and that that part of me was dead. It is possible to pretend that you are someone else – I was 'dad' to my two little boys and I wrote nearly 20 books... but it was not 'me'. I was denying a part of myself and that isn't healthy."

He returned to music with 2004's Pavane. Nevermore (2008) saw Roland recount the case of Jack the Ripper, revive stories by Edgar Allan Poe, and address characters such as Leatherface (from the 1974 film The Texas Chain Saw Massacre) and Captain Nemo (from the novels of Jules Verne); it was positively received by Metal.de. A 2010 remastered version of 1989's Duel – a record that Roland had originally "hated" – garnered favourable reviews from Marco Rossi of Record Collector, and Ox-Fanzine's Joachim Hiller, who recalled the album as a "masterpiece". Grimm (2011), based on tales by the Brothers Grimm, saw Roland play all the instruments by himself; it was described by Andrew Young of Ptolemaic Terrascope as "one of the strongest albums in Paul Roland's quite extensive catalogue".

In December 2016, Roland released White Zombie. Initially intended as an unofficial soundtrack to the 1932 film starring Bela Lugosi, it turned into a collection of songs with incidental music. Recorded mainly in Italy, the album was well-received by Italian magazine Blow Up, who named it "album of the month". It was produced by Max Marchini (who also played bass), and includes guest appearances by several Italian artists. "Mambo Jo" also featured as the title track of a simultaneously released EP. In 2017, Roland's 30-minute Grimm Fantasy suite was arranged for orchestral performance by composer David Roche. He released a live album, Live at Raindogs House (credited to Paul Roland & His Rockin' Teenage Combo), in 2025.

Roland has amassed an extremely large discography. Kris Needs referred to a "vast catalogue" representing a "creative maze which continues to expand". Roland often signed to labels that soon went out of business, rendering his musical output only partially available; several of his works have been revised and republished during the 21st century. Cherry Red Records assumed responsibility for his catalogue in the mid 2010s.

=== Reception and legacy ===
Roland is recognised as an "underground" artist within the psychedelic sphere; Music Week dubbed him a "psychedelic cult celebrity". In 2010, Marco Rossi of Record Collector described Roland as "a cherished figure on the gothic rock and psychpop periphery for 30 years", while praising his "impeccable narratives". Rossi's colleague Ian Abrahams proclaimed Roland a "psych-pop genius", his work "full of gruesome atmosphere" and featuring a "mastery of character". Roland has gathered a stronger fanbase in mainland Europe than in his native UK, which Abrahams called "a peculiar situation when you hear his quintessentially eccentric Englishness". Louder Than War's Ian Canty hailed him as a "master story-teller" with a "unique gift for songwriting", asserting that "Roland belongs alongside great British musical eccentrics like Ivor Cutler, Robyn Hitchcock, Momus and Billy Childish". Canty compared his singing voice to that of the Only Ones' Peter Perrett.

Roland was described by Hitchcock as "the male Kate Bush", while musician Frank Zappa said, "[Roland] write[s] nice melodies and has a very particular personality, but is far too intellectual for me!" He has been labelled in the media as "the Lord Byron of rock" and "the Edgar Allan Poe of psych". Roland has been credited with inventing steampunk music; Cory Gross of SteamPunk Magazine wrote that bands like Abney Park and Vernian Process manifested the genre while "following in the footsteps" of Roland and others. Vernian Process founder Joshua Pfeiffer asserted, "If anyone deserves credit for spearheading steampunk music, it is [Roland]. He was one of the inspirations I had in starting my project. He was writing songs about the first attempt at manned flight, and an Edwardian airship raid in the mid-80s long before almost anyone else." Roland was also influential on rock band Temples.

Roland's work has been generally well-received by critics throughout his career. Jim DeRogatis credited Roland for "masterful Syd Barrett-style pop tunes orchestrated in the manner of S.F. Sorrow by the Pretty Things", and placed Danse Macabre (1987) at number two in his "Two Dozen Great Psychedelic Rock Records from the First Revival". Ian Canty wrote that the album is "perhaps [Roland's] masterpiece – eleven sepia-tinted excellently constructed novellas wrapped in pristine Psych Pop, totally out of step with the modern world of music at the time and benefiting hugely from the fact". Ox-Fanzine's Joachim Hiller also had praise for Danse Macabre, hailing it as a "classic album" that "delighted quite a few people at the time". Several of Roland's works have been listed as collectibles.

== Writing career ==
Roland has worked as a music journalist, writing for publications including Sounds, Kerrang! and Hi-Fi News & Record Review. He has authored five books on musician Marc Bolan, and was a key contributor to the BBC documentary film Marc Bolan: The Final Word (2007). Aside from popular music, Roland's many books cover subjects including crime, World War II, and the supernatural.

== Personal life ==
Roland lived in Margate, Kent during the 1980s and 1990s. In 2006, he left England to live in Germany. He later returned to the UK and lives in Cambridgeshire with his wife and two sons.

Roland is a rugby fan.

== Selected discography ==
The following is a sampling of Roland's extensive discography:

=== Albums ===
- 1980 - The Werewolf of London (pubblicato come "Midnight Rags", Ace Record)
- 1986 - House of dark shadows (Pastell Records)
- 1987 - Danse Macabre (Bam Caruso)
- 1987 - A Cabinet of Curiosities (New Rose Records)
- 1988 - Happy Families (New Rose Records)
- 1989 - Duel (New Rose Records)
- 1990 - Masque (New Rose Records)
- 1991 - Roaring Boys (New Rose Records)
- 1992 - Strychnine (New Rose Records)
- 1994 - Sarabande (Gaslight Records)
- 1997 - Gargoyles (Gaslight Records)
- 2004 - Pavane (Gaslight Records)
- 2007 - Re-Animator (Syborgmusic)
- 2008 - Nevermore (Syborgmusic)
- 2011 - Grimm (Syborgmusic)
- 2013 - Bates Motel (Sireena)
- 2013 - Hexen (Palace of Worms)
- 2014 - Professor Moriarty's Jukebox (Sireena)
- 2015 - Bitter and Twisted (Sireena Records)
- 2016 - House of Dark Shadows
- 2016 - In the Opium Den The Early Recordings
- 2017 - White Zombie (Unifaun Productions)
- 2018 - Grimmer Than Grimm (Unifaun Productions)
- 2019 - 1313 Mocking Bird Lane (Unifaun Productions)
- 2020 - Liar Of The White Worm (Unifaun Productions)
- 2022 - Through The Spectral Gate with Mick Crossley (Unifaun Productions)
- 2023 - Wyrd Tales Of An Antiquary (Unifaun Productions)
- 2025 - Live at Raindogs House (Unifaun Productions)
- 2026 - Brighton Rock (Unifaun Productions)

=== Compilations ===
- House of Dark Shadows (1986)
- Confessions of an Opium Eater (1987)
- Waxworks (1995)
- Gaslight Tales (2003)
- Demos (2009)
- In Memorium 1980–2010 (2010)
- In The Opium Den - The Early Recordings 1980-87 (2016)
