= Hi-Fi News & Record Review =

British magazine

- Frequency: Monthly
- Founded: 1956
- First issue: June 1956; 70 years ago
- Company: AVTech Media Ltd.
- Country: United Kingdom
- Based in: Orpington
- Language: English
- Website: hifinews.com
- ISSN: 2042-0374

Hi-Fi News & Record Review (often abbreviated to Hi-Fi News) is a British monthly magazine published by AVTech Media Ltd. Established in 1956, it reviews audiophile-oriented sound-reproduction and recording equipment, and includes information on new products and developments in audio. The magazine also reviews commercial music releases.

== History ==
Hi-Fi News & Record Review was founded in 1956 by Miles Henslow. Betty West, wife of hi-fi "pioneer" Ralph West, guaranteed the loans that made Henslow's launch possible. The magazine aims to deliver "reviews of the key products and technologies that lie behind our shared hobby... listening to music on the very best equipment available to the enthusiast." To coincide with the magazine's 50th anniversary, the book Sound Bites: 50 Years of Hi-Fi News, by Ken Kessler and Steve Harris, was published by IPC Media.

Stereophile noted Hi-Fi News & Record Review as a "prestigious" UK publication. Personnel have included Fred Dellar, John Atkinson and Paul Roland.

Previously, the magazine was published by MyTimeMedia Ltd.

== Sister publications ==
Other notable publications also owned by AVTech Media include:

- Sound & Vision
- Stereophile
