= The Neverwas Haul =

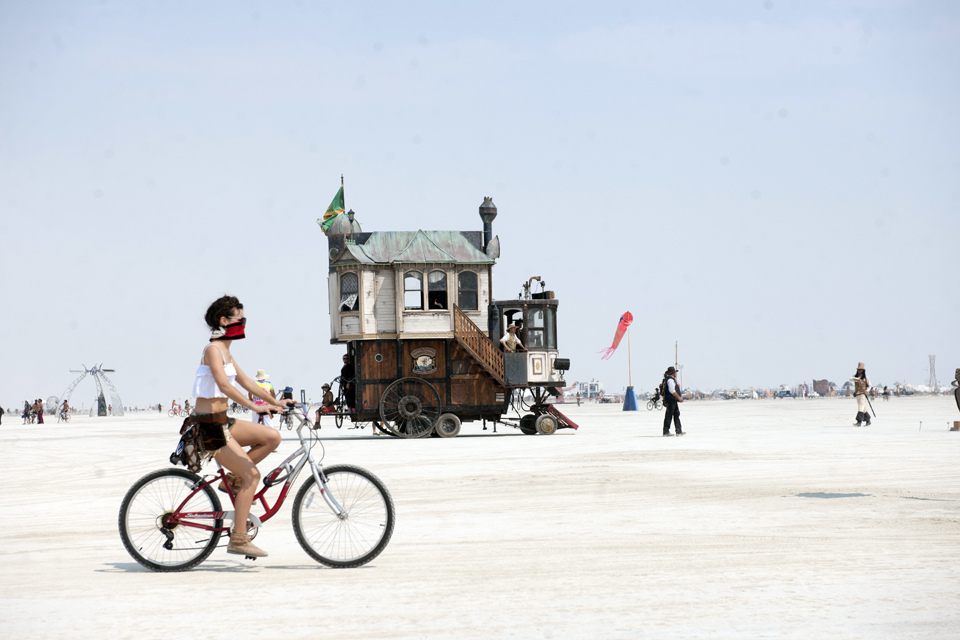
The Neverwas Hall art car at Burning Man, 2013. It can reach a staggering speed of 3 1/2 miles per hour.

The Neverwas Haul is a three-story, self-propelled mobile art vehicle built to resemble a Victorian house on wheels. Inspired by the fantastical stories of Jules Verne and H.G. Wells, the Haul was designed by Shannon O’Hare and built by a crew of volunteers at the Shipyard art space in Berkeley, CA, in 2006. Originally intended to be a ‘mutant vehicle’ for the Burning Man art festival in Nevada, the Haul is made from 75% recycled materials, and measures 24 feet long, 24 feet high, and 12 feet wide. It is built on the base of a fifth-wheel trailer, and the second and third story of the structure pack down into the first for highway towing. When fully built and decked out for exhibition at Burning Man, the Haul is able to propel itself at a top speed of 5 miles per hour and requires a crew of ten people to operate safely (since Victorian houses are notoriously lacking in side- and rear-view mirrors). Currently, the Neverwas Haul makes her home at Obtainium Works, an “art car factory” in Vallejo, CA, owned by O’Hare and home to several other self-styled “contraptionists.”

== Steampunk fiction and art ==
The Haul is often associated with steampunk, a sub-cultural movement that draws its inspiration from a fusion of Victorian-era science fiction and contemporary technology. True to the alternative histories that are a staple of the steampunk genre, the Neverwas Haul has its origin story in a history that never was, a history in which the Hibernian Empire (not the British Empire) dominated the sociopolitical landscape of the nineteenth century—Hibernia being an obscure name for Ireland. In this mythology, the Neverwas Haul is the greatest of all the Hauls – Romani vardo-like vehicles driven by "Track Banshees" – itinerant women who use their preternatural mechanical skills to keep their families on the move. The Haul is the primary mode of transport for the ″Traveling Academy of Unnatural Science,″ who seek to acculturate the heathens of the Black Rock Desert (where the Burning Man festival is held) by sharing such cultural staples as Gin and Tonics, and High Tea.

== Accommodations ==
The Neverwas Haul consists of three major sections: engine room, command deck, and parlor. The engine room stores extra cargo and seats up to six people. The command deck is dominated by a full size ship's wheel for steering. The controls are a throttle for hydraulic control, and a dead man switch for emergency stops. The parlor is well apportioned: it has a bar, library, veranda, vintage stuffed chairs, and a camera obscura. There are even stairs to the "widows walk" which has a rooftop view. While many media sources cite the Neverwas Haul as an unusual RV or Winnebago, it is primarily a large overly detailed kinetic art piece.

== Media appearances ==
Outside of Burning Man, the Neverwas Haul is featured in books, TV and several music videos:

- 2022-2023: On exhibit and open to the public at Mare island Art Studios.
- 2021: Returned to Vallejo and open again to the public at the Mare Island Art Yard, a temporary art exhibit sponsored by the Mare Island Brewing Company. A detailed report is covered in the Steampunk Explorer blog.
- 2020: Trapped in Vegas. On display on Freemont Street behind a security gate at a closed hotel.
- 2018–2019: The Neverwas Haul was on display at the Lyft Art Park in Las Vegas as part of a revolving display of Burning Man Art pieces.
- 2015: The Vintage Tomorrows documentary showcased the Neverwas Haul and crew at both Burning Man and hosting a Steampunk Wedding.
- 2013: A feature of the Vintage Tomorrows book and 2016 documentary about the Steampunk movement and its effect on technology.
- 2012: One of the featured art pieces in Abney Park's "Steampunk Revolution" music video.
- 2012: Appeared on Oddities: San Francisco TV Show, Season 01, Episode 04, "Holy Hydrocephalic Cow."
- 2010: Musician Renée de la Prade tours the Neverwas Haul while singing in Culann's Hounds' "Land of Lost Things" music video.
- 2009: Converted into a haunted house, the Neverwas Haul was showcased inside the Exploratorium for a Halloween exhibit. Live tours included a rampaging robot, and Mad Scientists scaring the children with a "Killer Rabbit" puppet.
- 2007: The Neverwas Haul premiered at the second annual Maker Faire in San Mateo Fairgrounds in Silicon Valley. It was showcased at the event for three years in a row.
