= League of STEAM =

American performance art troupe

The League of S.T.E.A.M.
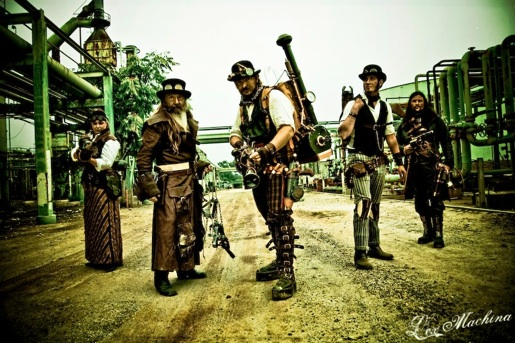
- The League of STEAM. Shown, L-R: Lady Ameliorette Potts, Jasper Mooney, Crackitus Potts, Baron von Fogel, Sir Conrad Wright III
- Formation: 2008
- Type: Theatre group
- Purpose: Performance art, Steampunk, Web series
- Location: Southern California, United States
- Members: Nicholas Baumann; Andrew Fogel; Trip Hope; Conrad Wright; Duane Matthews; Russell Isler; Robin Blackburn; Glenn Freund; Sheyne Fleischer; Katherine Blackmoore
- Website: League of STEAM

The League of S.T.E.A.M. (Supernatural and Troublesome Ectoplasmic Apparition Management), a.k.a. the "Steampunk Ghostbusters", is an American performance art troupe from Southern California popular in the steampunk community and specializing in live interactive themed entertainment.

== The League ==
The League of S.T.E.A.M. is modeled after the 1984 film Ghostbusters, translating the idea of a "paranormal pest control service" into a neo-Victorian steampunk setting. The League has performed at conventions, steampunk festivals, nightclubs and corporate events, and have performed alongside such notable steampunk musical groups as Abney Park. They are known for their creative steampunk "inventions" (functional props), and have also been written about and interviewed as leading examples of steampunk style.

== The W.A.T.C.H. ==
The League has a partnership with The W.A.T.C.H. (Worldwide Alliance for the Tracking of Creatures and Haunts) led by Coyote and Ellie Copperbottom. Through the W.A.T.C.H. the League uses Junior League W.A.T.C.H. members who are hopefuls to become a part of the League and go on adventures. They are called by the League, "redshirts". A couple of Junior League W.A.T.C.H. members have appeared in recent web episodes.

== History ==
The idea that would eventually become the League of S.T.E.A.M. came from Robin Blackburn's desire to make a ghost costume that actually glowed for the 2008 Labyrinth of Jareth Masquerade Ball in Hollywood, California. Her husband, Nicholas Baumann (a costume and prop maker for theatre, film and TV, specializing in foam fabrication and leather work), was more interested in steampunk, and came up with the idea to make a "steampunk ghostbuster" costume to match her. The costumes were created in collaboration with Scott and Gail Folsom, James Lavrakas and Aimee Chaouch, and the group's appearance was a phenomenal success. Robin, Nick, Gail, Scott and James were so pleased with their reception that they decided to continue to improve and develop their costumes and personas. Gail and Scott came up with a list of possible names for the group and The League of S.T.E.A.M. (Supernatural and Troublesome Ectoplasmic Apparition Management) was the unanimous choice. Since then, new members, props, sets and equipment have been added, and the characters became "monster hunters," to include a wide range of supernatural prey.

== Live shows ==
The League has performed several live shows in and around the Los Angeles area. These shows combine the concept of a Victorian Parlour Evening and a traveling Medicine Show. During which the members of the troupe mingle with the crowd, bragging of past exploits, demonstrating their prop gear and telling tall tales.

=== Past performances ===
- Queen Mary Pyrate Daze Festival, Long Beach, California September 18–20, 2009
- "An Evening with the Unfamiliar: Scientific Investigations of Paranormal Oddities" at Renee's Courtyard Cafe in Santa Monica, California January 17, 2010
- "An Evening with the Obscure: Scientific Investigations of Paranormal Oddities" at Bar Sinister in Hollywood, CA, March 27, 2010
- Labyrinth of Jareth Masquerade Ball, Hollywood, CA, 2010
- "The Boiler Bash: Nothing Bad Can Happen" at Bar Sinister in Hollywood, CA, September 25, 2010
- "Ghost Stories: A Night of Happenings and Hauntings" Beacon Arts Building, October 29, 2010

== Appearances and other work ==
=== Conventions and festivals ===
- Labyrinth of Jareth Masquerade Ball, Hollywood, CA, 2008, 2009
- California Steampunk Convention, 2008
- San Diego Comic-Con 2009 - Featured steampunk panelists
- San Diego Comic-Con's steampunk after-party "The Ventricular Engine", at the Radio Room in San Diego, California, July 2009.
- Maker Faire Bay Area, 2010
- Anime Expo 2010 - Featured steampunk panelists
- San Diego Comic-Con's steampunk after-party "The League of Temporal Adventurers First Society Gala", in San Diego, California, July 2010.
- DragonCon 2010 - steampunk panelists
- Steamcon II, 2010
- World Steam Expo, Dearborn, Michigan, May 2012
- Stan Lee's Comikaze Expo, Sept. 2012 - panelists
- The Wild Wild West Steampunk Convention in Tucson, Arizona; March 8–10, 2013 - performed with The Silent Still and Professor Elemental
- San Diego Comic-Con, San Diego, California; July 24–27, 2014

=== Music videos ===
- League of STEAM appeared in Panic! at the Disco's music video "The Ballad of Mona Lisa". The League's full ensemble cast appear in key roles in the video. They also brought in additional cast members to further populate the scene and create a richer atmosphere with a unified aesthetic. In addition, The League's Creative Director Nick Baumann acted as the production's primary steampunk consultant.

=== Guest appearances ===
- Performed with Abney Park at the Knitting Factory in Los Angeles, August 15, 2009

=== Other ===
- Appearances on the YouTube series Epic Meal Time on July 24, 2012
- Contributed props and made cameo appearances in the Castle episode "Punked."

== Web series ==
In November 2009, The League began producing a series of comedic webisodes that were released on YouTube. Called "The Adventures of the League of STEAM", the series chronicles the League on various adventures where they attempt to locate, capture or neutralize supernatural creatures. The webisode, "Fool's Gold" was one of YouTube's Spotlighted videos on Saint Patrick's Day (March 17), 2010, and was also featured on Boing Boing, TheAwesomer.com and Topless robot.

Season 2 featured guest stars, including MythBusters' Grant Imahara and Doug Jones (of Pan's Labyrinth and Hellboy fame).

In 2012, the League was nominated for International Academy of Web Television (IAWTV) awards in three categories: Best Design (Art Direction/Production), Best Costume Design and Best Makeup/Special Effects. They won the Best Costume Design and Best Makeup/Special Effects categories.

Their third season began in August 2014, guest starring veteran actor and voice actor Phil LaMarr.

=== Film festivals ===
Selected episodes from the League's web series have appeared in the following Film Festivals:

- Dragon Con 2010
- World Con 2010
- The Anaheim International Film Festival - New Media Expo 2010
- Valley Film Festival 2010
- The Tri-City Independent Film Festival 2010
- The Fargo Fantastic Film Festival 2010
- The Feel Good Film Festival 2010
- The Talent One Media Film Festival 2010
- The Rose City Steampunk Film Festival 2011

== Podcast ==
In January 2011, the League began a podcast which they titled "STEAM Geeks". In these podcasts members of the group gather to discuss topics of interest to members of the steampunk community, conduct reviews and answer mail from the audience.

== Members ==
The League has several main members that constitute the "ghostbusters", as well as support performers that perform as vampires, werewolves and poltergeists. The main performers of the League are:

- Crackitus Potts (Nicholas Baumann), Ghoul Containment Specialist - Co-founder of the group, Crackitus carries a backpack (the Phantom Eradication Apparatus) which can deliver bursts of "high pressure steam" to disperse ghostly apparitions. Crackitus has also invented a "hunting utility gun" (HUG) which can fire a detaining net. His stage name is a play on the main character from the movie, Chitty Chitty Bang Bang (which in itself was a play on "crackpot", a slang term for an eccentric inventor).
- Professor Jager (Scott Folsom), Ectoplasmic Apparition Containment Specialist - Co-founder of the group, Jager's backpack (the Electro-Ionized Matter Cannon) powers a "steam cannon" which can fire a variety of objects. Jäger (German pronunciation: [ˈjɛːɡɐ] as in Yeager) is the German word for "hunter".
- Lady Ameliorette Potts (Robin Blackburn), Tactical Coordination Specialist, wife of Crackitus Potts
- JayAre Jr. (James Lavrakas), Ectoplasmic Auditory Tracking Specialist - The youngest of the group, JayAre (according to the League's fiction) was a student of Thomas Edison. JayAre's backpack (the Electronic Voice Recorder) is supposedly a machine designed to pick up Electronic Voice Phenomena (EVPs), capturing them with a large phonograph horn and record them onto wax cylinders.
- Baron von Fogel (Andrew Fogel), Aerial Tactical Specialist - The Baron's backpack is ostensibly a jet pack for making short controlled flights.
- Sir Conrad Wright III (Conrad Wright), Vampire Elimination Specialist - Known to many colleagues simply as "Vampire Hunter C" (an allusion to the Japanese manga and anime series Vampire Hunter D), Wright carries an assortment of stakes, crucifixes, garlic and other traditional vampire-hunting apparatus, as well as a wooden stake blunderbuss and twin holy water hand blasters.
- Jasper Mooney (Duane Matthews), Lycanthrope Disposal Specialist - The League's expert on were-creatures, Mooney also assists Wright in his vampire-hunting duties.
- Zeddediah (Russell Isler) - Zeddediah, or "Zed" (a slang term for a zombie), is the zombie twin brother of the League's manservant Thaddeus (also played by Russell Isler), and has been fitted with a restraining collar and trained to be a butler for the group. Like many of the group's "inventions" the collar has been known to malfunction from time to time.
- R.O.S.E. (Gail Folsom) - R.O.S.E. ("Reanimate Optimized Search Engine") is the League's clockwork cyborg, created by Prof. Jager to respond to hazardous situations (such as zombie control) by means of a punch card interface on her back.
- Katherine Blackmoore (Kate Walsh) - an expert with blunt objects, she favors baseball and cricket bats as her primary skull-crushing weapons.
- The Russian (Aubriana Zurilgen) - Cryptozoological Expert, the go-to source for any and all information pertaining to mythological, cryptozoological and biological creatures that inhabit our world or any plane attached to it. She found that joining the League suits her research needs, as their activities grant her greater exposure to the super- and extra-natural creatures which she studies than she could manage solo. The Russian's secretive nature and mysterious past belies a tender heart that cannot resist helping the creatures she comes across.
- Coyote Copperbottom (Glenn Freund) - W.A.T.C.H. Co-founder, after moving into the house next to the League of S.T.E.A.M.'s Manor with his wife Ellie Copperbottom, the jovial and inquisitive Coyote quickly established a friendly bond between the houses. Upon noticing how the League was struggling with the world's surplus of paranormal activity, Ellie and Coyote founded the World-wide Alliance for the Tracking of Creatures and Haunts to collect and compile reports from around the world. Coyote also has an uncanny ability with the League's field equipment, even though no one can remember training him on it...
- Ellie Copperbottom (Sheyne Fleischer) - W.A.T.C.H. Co-founder, wife of Coyote, Ellie would much rather stay at home baking then go out on adventures with "the boys." Ellie & Coyote could not help but become aware of the League's (mis)adventures. After a particularly...unpleasant... mishap with a kitten in a tree, they decided to create the League W.A.T.C.H. (Worldwide Alliance for the Tracking of Creatures and Haunts) in order to help the league (and guard against future kitty killings!) While Ellie is resourceful and fully capable of defending herself, her best defense is to avoid conflict and bake some nice warm chocolate chip cookies!
- Albert Able, Esq. (Trip Hope) - The group's banker/financier, archivist of supernatural relics and a spectral specialist.
