= Steampunk'd =

American reality television series

- Genre: Reality television
- Presented by: Jeannie Mai
- Judges: Kate Lambert; Matt King; Thomas Willeford
- Country of origin: United States
- Original language: English
- No. of seasons: 1
- No. of episodes: 8

Production
- Executive producers: Kimberly Belcher Ehrhard; John Ehrhard; Lauren Stevens; Jennifer J. Duncan
- Running time: 40−42 minutes
- Production company: Pink Sneakers Productions

Original release
- Network: Game Show Network
- Release: August 19 – October 14, 2015

Steampunk'd is an American reality television series broadcast by Game Show Network. The series, hosted by Jeannie Mai, premiered August 19, 2015. The contestants (called "makers") are crafters and designers who specialize in the steampunk genre.

== Production ==
The series was green-lit on March 10, 2015, along with Lie Detectors. GSN later announced Mai as host on June 15. The series premiered August 19, 2015. The show's filming took place in one month.

=== Contestants ===
The 10 steampunk artists competing in the first season are:

Contestant	Age	Hometown	Place Finished
Steampunk Eddie	50	Jackson, Michigan	Winner
Miss Morgan	35	Los Angeles, California	Runner Up
JW	42	Silverton, Oregon	3rd
Ave	35	Culver City, California	4th
Charles	37	Hillsboro, Oregon	5th
Karianne	29	Madison Heights, Michigan	6th
Tayliss	22	Lake Forest, California	7th
James	32	Hermitage, Tennessee	8th
Ladyhawk	33	Tallahassee, Florida	9th
Tobias	21	Kent, Washington	10th

=== Contestant Progress ===
Elimination Chart
Artists	1	2	3	4	5	6	7	8
Steampunk Eddie	WIN‡	SAFE	WIN	WIN	WIN	SAFE‡	LOW‡	WINNER
Miss Morgan	SAFE	SAFE‡	LOW	WIN	WIN‡	LOW	WIN	RUNNER-UP
JW	LOW‡	WIN	WIN‡	SAFE	WIN	WIN‡	SAFE‡	3RD PLACE
Ave	WIN	WIN‡	SAFE	LOW	LOW	WIN	OUT	
Charles	SAFE	LOW	SAFE	WIN	SAFE‡	OUT		
Karianne	WIN	WIN	WIN	WIN‡	OUT			
Tayliss	WIN	WIN	WIN	OUT‡				
James	WIN	WIN	OUT‡					
Ladyhawk	SAFE	OUT						
Tobias	OUT							

The contestant won Steampunk'd.
The contestant was the Runner-Up.
The contestant in 3rd Place.
The contestant was on the winning team that week.
The contestant was on the losing team that week, but was safe.
The contestant was in the bottom 2.
The contestant was eliminated.
The contestant was on the winning team, but was eliminated.

‡ The contestant was the team captain that week.

== Teams ==
Episode 1
Team JW	Team Steampunk Eddie
JW	Eddie
Morgan	Ave
Tobias	Tayliss
Charles	Karianne
Ladyhawk	James

Episode 2
Team Ave	Team Miss Morgan
Ave	Morgan
James	Eddie
Karianne	Ladyhawk
Charles	JW
Tayliss	

Episode 3
Team James	Team JW
James	JW
Ave	Karianne
Charles	Tayliss
Morgan	Eddie

Episode 4
Team Karianne	Team Tayliss
Karianne	Tayliss
Charles	Ave
Eddie	JW
Morgan	

Episode 5
Team Charles	Team Miss Morgan
Charles	Morgan
Ave	Eddie
Karianne	JW

Episode 6
Team JW	Team Steampunk Eddie
JW	Eddie
Ave	Morgan
	Charles

Episode 7
Team JW	Team Steampunk Eddie
JW	Eddie
Ave	Morgan

== Reception ==
Kevin McDonough of the Times Herald-Record called the show the "latest quirky variation on Project Runway" and said, "The 'makers' look like they escaped from a Tim Burton movie about an interstellar Renaissance faire, by way of an exploding craft store. Win or lose, they're something to behold."
