= James Richardson-Brown =

- Born: James Brown; 11 August 1982 (age 44); Walthamstow, London, England, United Kingdom
- Occupations: Novelist; Journalist; Visual artist
- Writing career
- Notable work: Sydeian Coalition series
- Website: sydeiancreations.com

James "Sydeian" Brown who writes under the pen name "James Richardson-Brown", is a British author, best known as the creator of The Sydeian Coalition steampunk/science fiction series, books, 3-D artworks and RPG. The Sydeian series has garnered a cult following around the world with fans from the UK, America, South Africa, India, etc. He is also known for his promotion of steampunk in the UK and for coining the term Steamgoth a movement that is fast growing in popularity

== The Sydeian Coalition books ==
The Sydeian Coalition books garnered a cult following on the web following Brown's decision along with his co-author Paul Taylor to make the first few chapters freely available to readers a tactic repeated with The Shattered Cog. The completed novel was published in early 2009 by YouWriteOn and Lightning Press. The book met with a warm reception from readers but was noted to have suffered due to a lack of proof-reading, editing and mistakes in listing by the publishers (to this day the book is found under the wrong title and author name in many places). The books are set in an alternative history where in 1866 the British had mastered space exploration indadvertantly sparking an interplanetary conflict between previously unknown inhabitants of the Solar System. The story follows the lives of Captain Sydeian, a disgraced army veteran and William Percival as they try to figure out how to defeat this new enemy.

The Sydeian Coalition is also the name of the fan club for the book.

K-1889 An example of Browns most popular creation

== Work as a 3-D artist ==
Using a mixture of found, hand crafted and raw materials, Brown creates objects that heavily draw on and in turn influence steampunk, science fiction, dieselpunk, alternative history and neo-Victorian styles. These works include devices, weapons, tools and ornamentation featured in his publications and working examples of modern technology such as mobiles phones, USB sticks, speakers and DVD players re-imagined in the steampunk aesthetic. Many of these works are released under the 'Sydeian Creations' collection with some of the darker work which more closely adheres to the steamgoth aesthetic released as part of the 'Black Laboratory'. His work has appeared in Museum of the History of Science, Oxford, the Hartford Artspace gallery, Chepstow castle, Bradford Industrial Museum and the British Library, as film props and within articles on steampunk both on and off the internet.

== Promotion of steampunk in the UK ==
Richardson-Brown did much to promote steampunk in its early days as a subculture in the UK. He has written articles about the steampunk subculture, given demonstrations of steampunk fashion and sculpture to wider audiences and has given interviews regarding the definition of steampunk and the growing steampunk movement. In 2007 he hosted the UK's first steampunk meet-up, held in a large tearoom during the Whitby Goth Weekend. A tradition that is still ongoing.

He also performs on stage as 'Sir Sydeian Strong', a recreation of a traditional Victorian strongman routine.

== Publications ==
1. The Sydeian Coalition - A Steampunk Adventure (2009)
2. The Shattered Cog (2010)

=== Articles ===
- "Steampunk, An Introduction", The Chap 2009
- "Steampunk, What's that all about?" Chronicles Magazine 2008
- "Steampunk" by Amaranth, featuring an interview with Brown Unscene Magazine 2008
