= Thomas Willeford =

Steampunk writer, artist and maker

Thomas Dean Willeford V (born October 29, 1964) is a steampunk writer, artist and maker. He is known for his work appearing on television and for his book Steampunk Gear, Gadgets, and Gizmos. He lives and works in Harrisburg, Pennsylvania, doing business as Brute Force Studios. His steampunk subculture persona is Lord Archibald "Feathers" Featherstone.

== Early life and education ==
Brought up in a Victorian house with a "mad scientist" grandfather who worked for DuPont, Willeford was educated at University of Maryland, College Park, Shenandoah University, University of Delaware and the University of Oxford.

== Work ==
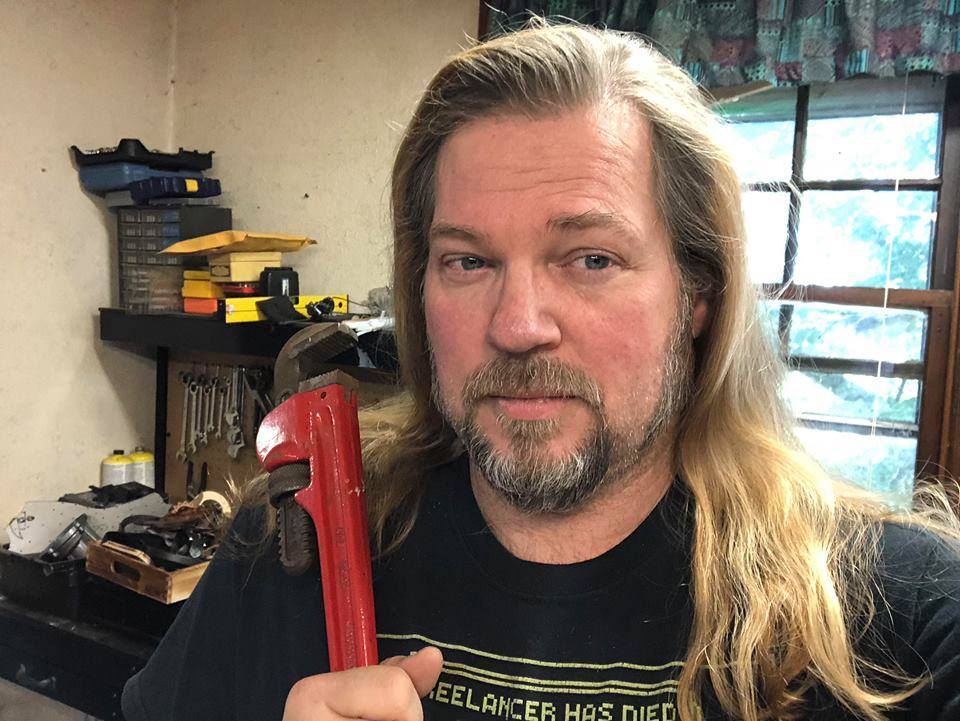
Thomas Willeford in his Studio.

In 1988, Willeford became interested in steampunk and began working on pieces that combined his love of engineering and art. He created the steampunk arm worn by Nathan Fillion in episode 3.4 of the television series Castle. His work has been displayed at the University of Oxford's Museum of the History of Science, at the Steampunk Bizarre Experiment, the Penn State Berks Freyberger Gallery, at Nemo's Steampunk Art & Invention Gallery and at the Charles River Museum of Industry and Innovation, and has been featured in Popular Mechanics. He is a contributor to Bruce Boxleitner's Lantern City and was a judge on Game Show Network's Steampunk'd.

Willeford was a guest curator for the Steampunk U exhibit at the Antique Automobile Club of America Museum in Hershey, Pennsylvania.

== Awards and recognition ==
- Airship Awards 2013 – Community Contributor – Nominee
- Balticon 19 Masquerade – Best Marvel Comic Re-Creation (Nightcrawler)
- Balticon 20 Masquerade – Journeyman Costumer – Honorable Mention
- Balticon 29 Masquerade – Best in Class: Novice
- Balticon 48 Masquerade – Best in Show
- Comic Con International 2014: Costume Contest on the Marvel Stage – One of a Kind: Iron Man 1889
- Darkover VIII Masquerade – Best Presentation (X-Men)
- Eeriecon Masquerade 2002 – Master Class: Best Leatherwork ("Gargoyle Knight")
- EveCon 5 Masquerade – Most Dramatic
- NYClone 1986 Masquerade – Chairman's Appreciation: Re-Creation
- Philcon 50 Masquerade – Craftsman: Most Humorous
- Rovacon 10 Masquerade – Best Comic Book Character
- Starburner 2011 Award for Contributions to Steampunk
- Steampunk Chronicle Readers Choice Awards 2012:
  - Best Maker – Individual
  - Best Mod Weaponry for Lady Clankington's Little Death Ray
  - Best Dressed Male
  - Best Non-Goggle Accessory for Superior Replacement Arm
  - Best Costume – Individual Original for the Clockwork Girl Outfit
  - Best Non-Fiction – Nominee
- Steampunk Chronicle Readers Choice Awards 2013:
  - Best Maker – Individual – Nominee
  - Most Influential or Inspirational – Nominee
  - Steam-Hunk – Nominee
  - Steampunk Person to Watch in 2013 – Nominee
- Technicon IV Masquerade – Best In Show
- Unicon 84 Masquerade – Best Recreation
- Numerous International Costumers Guild (ICG) Awards

== Bibliography ==
- Steampunk Gear, Gadgets, and Gizmos: A Maker's Guide to Creating Modern Artifacts. McGraw-Hill. October 2011. ISBN 978-0-07-176236-6.
- The Steampunk Adventurer's Guide: Contraptions, Creations, and Curiosities Anyone Can Make. McGraw-Hill. October 2013. ISBN 978-0-07-182780-5.

== Filmography ==
=== Television ===
Year	Title	Role	Notes	Ref(s)
2010	Castle	Props	Steampunk Arm	
2010	Oddities	Himself		
2013	Old Folks Home	Himself	Episode "Blow Off Some Steampunk"	
2015	Steampunk'd	Himself	As a judge	
