= SteamPunk Magazine =

Former subculture magazine

- Cover of Issue 3 of SteamPunk Magazine
- Editor: Margaret Killjoy
- Categories: Steampunk
- Frequency: Semi-annual
- Publisher: Strangers in a Tangled Wilderness; Vagrants Among Ruins; Combustion Books
- First issue: March 3, 2007
- Final issue Number: January 2016; 10
- Country: USA
- Based in: New York City
- Website: steampunkmagazine.com (now defunct)
- OCLC: 697621954

SteamPunk Magazine was an online and print semi-annual magazine devoted to the steampunk subculture which existed between 2007 and 2016. It was published under a Creative Commons license, and was free for download. In March 2008, SteamPunk Magazine began offering free subscriptions to incarcerated Americans, as a "celebration" of 1% of the US population being eligible.

SteamPunk Magazine was formerly published by anarchist zine publisher Strangers in a Tangled Wilderness in the United States and by Vagrants Among Ruins in the United Kingdom. The magazine was then published by the worker-run Combustion Books in New York City and distributed by anarchist publishing collective AK Press.

== Reception and recognition ==
- Two of the editors, Magpie Killjoy and Libby Bulloff, were invited to the 2008 Maker Faire in the San Francisco Bay Area.
- The popular blog Boing Boing, written by the sci-fi writer Cory Doctorow, announced every Steampunk Magazine release, including their Steampunk's Guide To The Apocalypse.
- SteamPunk Magazine was mentioned in a Newsweek article discussing the steampunk movement as an example of a steampunk periodical.
- An article in The Yale Herald uses SteamPunk Magazine as an example of microcultures and their ability to thrive on the Internet.

== Issues ==
=== Issue #1 ===
Putting the Punk Back into Steampunk

Interviews with:

- Author Michael Moorcock
- The Original Steampunk Band, Abney Park
- Singer/Songwriter Thomas Truax
- Composer Darcy James Argue

=== Issue #2 ===
A Journal of Misapplied Technology

Contents include:

- John Reppion

=== Issue #3 ===
The Sky is Falling

Contents include:

- Alan Moore
- Interview with Doctor Steel

=== Issue #4 ===
Our Lives as Fantastic as any Fiction

Contents include:

- Donna Lynch and Steven Archer

=== Issue #5 ===
Long Live Steampunk!

Contents include:

- Musician Voltaire

=== Issue #6 ===
The Pre–Industrial Revolution

Contents include:

- Author John Reppion
- Interview with Ghostfire

=== Issue #7 ===
Contents include:

- Articles on race and steampunk as well as the future of steampunk fashion
- Interviews with Sunday Driver and The Men That Will Not Be Blamed for Nothing

=== Issue #8 ===
Contents include:

- Instructions for making laudanum and a lexicon of 19th-century New York City slang
- Interview with Unwoman
