= Terence Lambert =

British wildlife painter (born 1951)

- Born: 1951 (age 74–75); Farnham, Surrey, England
- Education: Surrey
- Known for: Bird and wildlife paintings
- Notable work: Collins British Birds, Lambert's Birds of Shore and Estuary, Lambert's Birds of Garden and Woodland
- Children: 4, including Kate
- Website: terencelambert.com

Terence Lambert (born 1951) is a British wildlife painter. His work has been reproduced in more than forty publications.

Terence is married to a school headmistress/principal and has four daughters, one of whom, Kate "Kato" Lambert, is a successful model and fashion designer in the United States.

== Career ==
Born in 1951 in Farnham, Surrey, Terence studied at Guildford College of Art in Surrey. His career began in the early 1970s with his illustrations for Collins British Birds, where he was quickly recognised as an important new talent in the world of ornithological painting.

In 1984, he spent two months in spring and autumn in the Himalayas working with the World Pheasant Association. That same year he travelled to Oman researching a project commissioned by Shell Oil Company, producing six paintings which were then gifted to the Sultan of Oman. Past projects have also taken him on expeditions across Africa and North America.

== Exhibitions ==
Major collectors of his work include the McCartney's and the Astor family. Since Terence's first solo exhibition in London in 1972, he has continued to exhibit his work annually throughout Great Britain. In the 1980s and 1990s his works travelled in Northern Europe and the United States with sell-out shows in both London and Wales. His work has been selected for many of the world's most prestigious wildlife exhibitions, including The Leigh Yawkey Woodson Art Museum in Wisconsin, US and the inaugural show of the Society of Wildlife Art for the Nation at the Guildhall in London. In 1999 the Welsh Arts Council funded a major retrospective exhibition that travelled throughout Wales.

His repertoire of medium has extended from watercolour to include mixed medium on paper and canvas, huge pencil drawings and a unique method of working with ink on scraperboard.

== Bibliography ==
=== Books ===
- Collins British Birds. John Gooders and Terence Lambert. 249 colour and 65 black & white illustrations. 1982. Reprint 1987 and 1995 with a new dust wrapper.
- Lambert's Birds of Shore and Estuary. Collins. 58 colour and 8 black & white illustrations. 1979.
- Lambert's Birds of Garden and Woodland. Collins. Printed in six languages and a US edition. 64 colour illustrations. 1976

=== Books and booklets illustrated in whole or in part ===
- The Woodcock. Artists' Impressions. Swan Hill. 9 colour, 3 black & white illustrations. 2006.
- The Loch Fisher's Bible. Stan Headley. 14 black & white illustrations. Hale Publishers. 2005.
- George Forrest, Plant Hunter. Brenda McLean. 2 colour plates. Antique Collectors Club in association with the Royal Botanic Garden, Edinburgh. 2004.
- Dursley Birdwatching and Preservation Society. "50th Anniversary Year Exhibition Catalogue". 2003. 1 black & white illustration of a wren. Used extensively on catalogues, posters, flyers and labels during the celebrations in 2003.
- Wildfowl & Wetlands Trust members magazine. Cover illustration of a redshank. Summer edition 2001.
- Lintukartta Suomen Pesimalinnut. "A Domino Bird Chart". Domino Books Ltd. 2001. (Original design by Hermann Heinzel and illustrated by Lambert) 1979.
- "Conservation, Access and Recreation, an Overview 1999–2000". Colour cover. Welsh Water Annual Report. August July 2000.
- Game Conservancy Trust Scottish Fair, Scone, Perth. Colour cover for fair programme. 2000.
- "Conservation, Access and Recreation, an Overview 1998–99". Colour cover. Welsh Water Annual Report. August 1999.
- "The Wetland Bird Survey 1996–97". Colour cover. BTO, WWT, RSPB, JNCC. 1999.
- "Conservation, Access and Recreation, an Overview 1997–98". Colour cover. Welsh Water Annual Report. August 1998.
- I Wonder Why Vultures Are Bald: and Other Questions About Birds. Amanda O'Neill. 5 colour illustrations and cover. Kingfisher Books. 1997.
- "The Gamekeepers Auction Catalogue". Colour cover. The Gamekeepers Welfare Trust, BASC. 1997.
- "Conservation, Access and Recreation, an Overview 1996–97". Colour cover. Welsh Water Annual Report. August 1997.
- Children's First Encyclopedia. Sue Barraclough, C Evans & D Fox (editors). Colour dustwrapper repeated inside and a further 5 colour illustrations, 1 repeated on contents page. Kingfisher Books. 1996.
- "Gloucestershire Wildfowlers Association 40th Anniversary Handbook and Rules". Paul Walkden (editor). 8 black & white illustrations. GWA. 1996.
- Lessons from the Fish: An Anthology of Fishing Experiences Written by National Celebrities, Selected and edited by Len Colclough. Colour dustwrapper and 20 black & white illustrations. Swan Hill Press. 1996.
- "Conservation, Access and Recreation, an Overview 1995–96". Colour cover. Welsh Water Annual Report. August 1996.
- I Wonder Why the Dodo is Dead and Other Questions About Extinct and Endangered Animals. Andrew Charman. 1 colour plate. Kingfisher Books. 1996.
- Wild Technology. Phil Gates. Colour dustwrapper illustration. Kingfisher Books. 1995.
- An Exaltation of Skylarks. Stewart Beer. Colour dustwrapper illustration. SMH Books. Sussex. 1995.
- Kingfisher Field Guide to the Birds of Britain and Ireland. John Gooders. Dustwrapper illustration of a nuthatch, (not attributed to artist). Kingfisher Books. Reprint 1994.
- Birds In Wales. Roger Lovegrove, Graham Williams & Iolo Williams. 13 black & white illustrations. Poyser. 1994.
- Trout Flies of Wales. Moc Morgan. 1 black & white plate. Gomer Press. Revised edition 1993.
- Dinosaurs (Young World). Camilla Hallinan, (editor). 22 colour illustrations. Kingfisher Books. 1993.
- All Kinds of Animals (Young World). Camilla Hallinan, (editor). 43 colour illustrations. Kingfisher Books. 1992.
- Kingfisher Field Guide to the Birds of Britain and Europe. John Gooders. Colour dustwrapper illustration. Different from 1st edition see 1990. Kingfisher Books. 1993.
- A Companion to British Wildlife. Tony Soper. 18 colour illustrations. Marshall Cavendish. 1992.
- Wildlife Fact File Yearbook 1992. Sydney Francis (editor). Article on Lambert complete with colour illustrations. 1991.
- Wildlife Fact File. Sydney Francis (editor). 110 colour illustration cards building to a 7-volume set. International Masters Publishers Ltd. 1991.
- Angling in Art. Tom Quinn. 1 colour plate. Sportsman's Press. 1991. Permission was not sought from the artist prior to publication.
- Nature in Art. David Trapnell. 1 colour and 1 preliminary drawing reproduced in black & white. David and Charles. 1991.
- The Birdwatchers Year. Malcolm Greenhalgh. 12 black & white plates. Chancellor Press. 1990. Second edition 1993.
- Kingfisher Field Guide to the Birds of Britain and Europe. John Gooders. Colour dustwrapper, front and back. Kingfisher Books. 1990.
- Fishing in Wild Places. David Street. Colour frontispiece and 24 black & white illustration, 1 repeated on endpapers. Golden Grove, Llandysul. 1989. Reprinted by H.F & G. Witherby in 1990 and Penguin Books in 1995.
- Mid Wales Companion. Moira K Stone. 2 black & white illustrations. Antony Nelson. 1989.
- The Nature of Central Wales. Fred Slater. Colour frontispiece repeated on dustwrapper. Also 2 black & white illustrations. Barracuda books. Buckingham. 1988.
- A Companion to the British Countryside. Various contributors. 6 double page colour spreads. W.H. Smith Exclusive Books. 1989. Previously used in The Country Companion by David Buxton. Marshall Cavendish 1986.
- The Complete Birdwatchers Guide. John Gooders. 23 colour and 15 black & white illustrations. Kingfisher Books. 1988, reprinted 1989 and 1992.
- The Royal Society for the Protection of Birds, Countryside Diary 1987. Nigel Sitwell (editor). 4 colour plates. RSPB. 1986.
- The Country Companion. David Buxton, (editor). Weekly magazine building into a 7-volume work. Marshall Cavendish. 1986.
- Birds of Rivers, Lakes and Streams. Fred Milton (editor). Colour dustwrapper and 12 colour plates. Marshall Cavendish. 1985.
- Bird Watch. John Gooders (editor). Weekly magazine building into a 2-volume work. Marshall Cavendish. 1983.
- The Easy Way to Bird Recognition. John Kilbracken. Colour dustwrapper illustration. Kingfisher Books. 1982.
- Living Bird. 18th annual report of the Cornell Lab of Ornithology, 1979–1980. Douglas Lancaster (editor). 2 colour plates. Cornell University. 1980.
- "The Domino Guide to the Bird Table". Hermann Heinzel. Folded booklet. Fontana Books. 1979.
- Sea Shells of the West Indies. Colour dustwrapper illustration. Collins. 1977.

=== Other works ===
- 2004 Welsh Kite Trust. Christmas card, "Kite over Conifers". Available in 2 formats.
- 2004 Game Conservancy Trust. Wildlife Art Calendar 2005.
- 2003 Game Conservancy Trust. Wildlife Art Calendar 2004. 8 images. (3 artists).
- 2003 Welsh Kite Trust. Notelets. Pencil red kite image.
- 2002 Game Conservancy Trust. Wildlife Art Calendar 2003. 8 images. (3 artists).
- 2000 BASC. Wildlife Art Calendar. 3 images. May, June & December. 3000 printed.
- 2000 BASC. Christmas card. "Turtles" 30,000 printed.
- 1999 Mayor of Llanidloes. Christmas card. Red kites.
- 1999 Welsh Kite Trust. Christmas card. "Kites at Dawn". 6,000 printed.
- 1999 BASC. Christmas card. "Winter Greys" 30,000 printed. Sold out.
- 1995 BASC. Christmas card. "Blackcock at Lek" 30,000 printed. Sold out.
- 1994 United Kingdom Habitat Stamp. The Wildlife Habitat Trust.
- 1993 Flowers of Portugal. 12 ceramic plates. Mark Jones Studio.
- 1991 Badge for Hamdden Country Sports. (Welsh Water) Design of woodcock.
- 1989 Calendar: Lambert's Exotica. 6 colour plates and 6 pencil drawings. Lockwards.
- 1988 Calendar: Pheasants of the World. 6 colour plates and 6 pencil drawings. Lockwards.
- 1982-1995 Annual calendar with 12 colour plates from Collins British Birds by John Gooders.
- 1981 The Garden Bird Bells. 12 English bone china bells. Royal Doulton, Franklin Porcelain.
- 1978 Agriframes Company Christmas card. Redwing & fieldfare. (Plate from Lambert's Birds of Garden and Woodland).
