= Komikwerks =

Comic publisher

Komikwerks logo

Komikwerks is a comic publisher founded in 2000 by animation professional Shannon Denton and Internet design professional Patrick Coyle.

== History ==
The website Komikwerks.com went live on March 5, 2001. The initial mission of being to allow independent comic creators the means with which to get their own comics out to readers around the world utilizing the speed and economy provided by the internet.

The site launched with nine titles including Astounding Space Thrills by Steve Conley, Buzzboy by John Gallagher, Abby's Menagerie by Jenni Gregory, The Crater Kid by Marty Baumann and Johnny Smackpants by Patrick Coyle.

Byron Preiss' startup publishing venture iBooks took an interest in the company and became a minority owner in April 2003. That partnership continued until shortly after Preiss’ death in June 2005.

In July 2003, the company caught the interest of Hollywood management and production concern Circle of Confusion. They announced a deal that would allow the company to shepherd select works on the Komikwerks banner to film, animation, television and video games.

To date, many of Komikwerks properties have been optioned including Jason Kruse's The World of Quest, John Helfers and Bernie Wrightson’s The Nightmare Expeditions, Dan Mishkin and Tom Mandrake's The Forest King and Aaron Sowd's Masterminds.

In August 2003, Komikwerks published their first printed anthology of strips. Highlights of the book includes work by noteworthy comics, TV and animation pros like Andrew Cosby, Matt Haley, Andy Kuhn, Will Meuginot, Danny Miki among others, and featured the debut of Aaron Sowd’s Masterminds.

The anthology was a success and was followed up by four additional volumes over the next two years, each with increasing circulation. These volumes featured the works of such names as Keith Giffen, Dwayne McDuffie, Dave Johnson, Art Thibert, Dan Mishkin and Tom Mandrake.

In August 2004 Komikwerks entered into an agreement with comics legend Stan Lee. The result was the launch of Stan Lee's Sunday Comics, which featured premium quality strips, and the return of the Stan’s highly regarded column: Stan’s Soapbox.

In keeping with their goal of publishing comics through the most progressive and innovative means possible, Komikwerks began distributing free comics for the Sony PlayStation Portable in December 2005.

At the 2005 San Diego Comic-Con, the company unveiled a slate of illustrated novels for young readers. The new book imprint is named Actionopolis. Authors and illustrators contributing to the line include Keith Giffen, Louise Simonson, John Helfers, Joe Corroney, Budd Lewis, Thomas Perkins, Marsha Griffin, David, Annette and Ben Odell and Jon Bresman.

The company's books and illustrations were featured in "Mothwoman", the November 21, 2005 episode of the NBC primetime TV series Las Vegas.

The first wave of books from the Actionopolis line were released in September 2006. Titles include The Forest King by Dan Mishkin and Tom Mandrake, What I did on my Hypergalactic Interstellar Summer Vacation by Adam Beechen and Dan Hipp, Heir to Fire by Rob M. Worley and Mike Dubisch, Spirit of the Samurai by Gary Reed and Rick Hoberg and The Anubis Tapestry by Bruce Zick, Blackfoot Braves Society by Christopher E. Long and Michael Geiger.

On March 30, 2007, The CW Television Network announced that an animated series based on World of Quest would be part of its 2008/2009–present lineup.

On March 15, 2008, World of Quest debuted on the Kids WB! block for The CW Television Network.

== Published works ==
- (2003) Komikwerks Volume 1
- (2003) Komikwerks Volume 2
- (2004) Komikwerks Presents: Nuts & Bolts
- (2005) Komikwerks Presents: Rockets & Robots
- (2005) Komikwerks Presents: Thrills & Chills
- (2005) Dead Samurai
- (2006) The World of Quest
- (2006) The Forest King
- (2006) What I did on my Hypergalactic, Interstellar Summer Vacation
- (2006) Heir to Fire
- (2006) Spirit of the Samurai
- (2006) The Anubis Tapestry
- (2006) BlackfootBraves Society
- (2006) Zombie Monkey Monster Jamboree
- Dragonblood: The Awakening
- Astro-Aces: Galaxies Apart
- All Robots Must Die: Nacho-Geddon
- Agent Of D.A.N.G.E.R.: Strange Polarity
- Battery: The Arrival
- Blacke's Loch: Unto The Breach
- Children Of Olympus: Dust of Medusa
- Evolver: Apex Predator
- Gargantuan: Rise Of The Behemoths
- Henrietta Hex: Shadows From The Past
- Inheritance: Long Live The Zar
- Knightstar: Knight Of The Starborne
- Last Of The Lycans: Monarch Of The Moon
- The Legend Of TigerFist: Enter The Tiger
- Master Of Voodoo: Rise Of The Dead
- me/2: The Chaos Engine
- Megamatrix: Hero Within
- Monstrous: Blood And Gold
- The Nightmare Expeditions: Welcome To Nocturnea
- Prototype: Alphas Omega
- Road Rager: Dark Drivers
- Royal Crown Mystery Detectives League: Web Of Darkness
- Reckers: Absolute Mechanization
- Schism: Out Of The Shadows
- Sword Of The Seas: Atlantis Awakens
- Toltec: Enemy Within
- Upgrader: Re-Engineered
- Upgrader: Adaptation
- Valkyra: Destiny's Spear
- Vampirium: Millenium Of Shadows
- White Knight: Line Of Avalon
- Wonderworld: Kingdom In Crisis
- The Big Game
- Roxi Rangers
- The Revenant

== Other media ==
- (2007) World of Quest TV series on The CW Television Network
