= Lady Mechanika =

Steampunk comic created by Joe Benitez (2010–present)

- Cover to issue #0

Publication information
- Publisher: Aspen Comics; Benitez Productions; Image Comics
- Schedule: Irregular
- Format: Ongoing series
- Genre: Action/adventure, mystery, steampunk
- Publication date: August 2010

Creative team as of August 2024
- Created by: Joe Benitez
- Written by: Joe Benitez; Marcia Chen; Madeline Holly-Rosing
- Pencillers: Joe Benitez; Martin Montiel; Siya Oum
- Inkers: Studio J-13; Siya Oum
- Letterer: Michael Heisler
- Colorists: Peter Steigerwald; Beth Sotelo; Sabine Rich

Lady Mechanika is a steampunk comic created by comic artist Joe Benitez.

== Background ==
The Lady Mechanika, a comic series in the steampunk genre, was originally planned as a six-part story. Lady Mechanika's look was inspired by steampunk fashion icon Kato.

Aspen MLT agreed to produce the serial and began publishing them on an infrequent basis. The first issue of Lady Mechanika, issue #0, debuted and sold out in October, 2010. The third issue was scheduled for release December 21, 2011. At the Steamcon III convention, held October 2011 in Bellevue, Washington, Joe Benitez won the Airship Award in the Visual category for his work on the comic. Issues #4 and #5 were eventually released independently by Benitez under the Benitez Productions imprint in 2015. Six more Lady Mechanika miniseries would be released by Benitez Productions from 2015 to 2020, followed by the release of Lady Mechanika: The Monster of the Ministry of Hell by Image Comics in 2022.

== Titles ==
List of Lady Mechanika stories and series
Publication date	Story	TPB volume	HC volume
2010	"The Demon of Satan's Alley" (Lady Mechanika #0)	Volume 1	
2011–15	"The Mystery of the Mechanical Corpse" (Lady Mechanika #1–5)	Volume 1	
2015	The Tablet of Destinies #1–5	Volume 2	
2016	The Lost Boys of West Abbey #1–2	Volume 3	
2016	La Dama de la Muerte #1–3	Day of the Dead; Special	Volume 4
2017	The Clockwork Assassin #1–3	Volume 4	Volume 3
2018	"Two" (Free Comic Book Day 2018: Lady Mechanika)	Volume 5	Volume 4
2018	La Belle Dame sans Merci #1–3	Volume 5	Volume 4
2020	Sangre #1–5 (2020)	Volume 6	Volume 5
2022	The Monster of the Ministry of Hell #1–4	Volume 7	—N/a
2024	The Devil in the Lake #1–4 (2024)	Volume 8	—N/a
2025–26	The Mechanical Menagerie #1–4	TBA	

"The Demon of Satan's Alley" and "The Mystery of the Mechanical Corpse" were published with the name of simply Lady Mechanika without any subtitles on their comic book releases. The subtitles were later added within the first volume compilation for clarity.

There have been a number of Free Comic Book Day (FCBD) sampler issues distributed yearly between 2016 and 2021, which were all reprints of the original prequel 'The Demon of Satan's Alley', with the exception of the issue released in 2018, which included an additional story titled "Two" that was later republished along with 'La Belle Dame sans Merci' in the fifth trade paperback.

The 'La Dama de la Muerte' series was later republished in a special 'Day of the Dead' volume after the third trade paperback and was not designated a specific volume number.

Many of the trade paperback and hardcover compilations include extra artwork or story, which were not published within the original comic book releases.

The hardcover compilations follow a different numbering scheme starting from the third volume, due to the recompilation of multiple trade paperbacks in one. Volumes 3 & 4 of the trade paperback were merged into hardcover volume 3, as well as volumes 5 and the Day of the Dead special into hardcover volume 4. No hardcover has been announced for volume 7 of the trade paperback at this time.

'The Devil in the Lake' is a new series successfully greenlit on Kickstarter that began distribution in September 2023 digitally as well as physically through the mail and at various conventions.

== Plot ==
=== Vol. 1: The Mystery of the Mechanical Corpse ===
The story is set in early 20th-century England and features the titular character of Lady Mechanika, who is the only survivor of a London serial killer and was found in an abandoned lab with mechanical arms and no memories of her past. Employing her mechanical arms and occult knowledge as a private detective, she tries to find out who she really is.

=== Vol. 2: The Tablet of Destinies ===
A professor of archaeology and a German scientist together discover a chamber created in Sumerian times in the middle of Africa. In it lies a mysterious Tablet, the key to infinite wealth and power. Lady Mechanika is drawn in to protect the archaeologist's granddaughter, Winifred, from would-be kidnappers intending to use her to incentivise her grandfather to work more quickly and disclose to them the secrets of the Tablet. Winifred is kidnapped in London but rescued in Germany by Lady Mechanika. Using a flying dirigible hot air balloon provided by a Rosicrucian secret society, Lady Mechanika and Winifred are over the Sahara on the way to the archaeological dig when the dirigible is attacked by a group connected to the people who meanwhile have taken forcible charge of the archaeological expedition. They pose as Germans but are in fact Serpent creatures able to assume human form. Lady Mechanika and Winifred escape the explosion of the dirigible, cross the desert with the help, first, of a slaver party and, later, of a band of female warriors, the Desert Wraiths. Eventually Akina, one of the warriors joins the two of them in finding, attacking and overcoming the Serpent group before the Serpents are able to take the Tablet, which turns out to be a nuclear weapon, to destroy Berlin. In order to rid the world of knowledge of the weapon, the escaping Lady Mechanika and friends launch the weapon from the archaeologist's dirigible into the heart of the mountain below where other weapons of the same kind are thought to be hidden. Winifred returns to London with her grandfather; the scientist goes into hiding with another identity for cover; Lady Mechanika receives a coded thank you message from the leader of the Rosicrucian group.

=== Vol. 3: The Lost Boys of West Abbey ===
Set in West Abbey, a poor district of Mechanika City, the story begins with a young orphan boy and an attempt by his captor to trap the boy's mind in the body of a mechanical toy. Lady Mechanika's inability to recall her own origins prompt her, once the newspapers write about “secret mechanical experiments and murders,” to assist, unofficially, Detective Inspector Singh of the City police. In this she is aided by her friend, Mr Lewis. The bodies of five suffocated street urchins are found in a creepy basement mechanical workshop, each of them bearing on their foreheads blood-marks written in Hebrew. Having interviewed other urchin boys, the search is on for a man known only as “the toy man”, whose face is half covered by a scar. One of the boys has pickpocketed the toy man and taken a small Jewish relict, which is handed to the policeman. Lewis takes home to investigate it a mechanical teddy bear, which has a small compartment containing a parchment scroll with the Hebrew word for Death written on it. He pockets this parchment. Lady Mechanika and DI Singh interview a Jewish Rebbe who reveals that the relict may have been used to ward off evil spirits by someone who summoned and controls them. Lady Mechanika and Lewis interview an innocent mechanical toymaker who has supplied to order mechanical figures with small compartments in the mouth for a Mr Durrant. The figures supplied include a ten foot high clockwork man. Durrant is the wealthy but elderly and frail owner of the workshop building. Lady Mechanika, DI Singh and Mr Lewis visit Durrant in Lewis’ flying vehicle. They inspect the house, discover the toy man who confesses, but are attacked by the ten foot high man, a body now inhabited by Lord Durrant. Durrant had become obsessed with avoiding death and with creating a race of gods, using all the best minds of humanity and capturing them in mechanical creatures. The fight ends when Lady Mechanika places the Death parchment in the mouth of the ten foot high man, who shuts down. Lady Mechanika parts company with DI Singh on excellent terms. She and Lewis rush home, fearing the mechanical bear from which the parchment was taken may have “woken up” and become a threat to Winifred, Lady Mechanika's young friend. In fact, they find she has taught the bear to play the piano to a remarkable degree: it chooses to be called Mon-Ti, but it is left unanswered as to whether the bear contains the mind of the other small boy missing from the urchin group, but devoid of memories as is Lady Mechanika.
