= Aaron Sowd =

American comic book creator, writer and artist

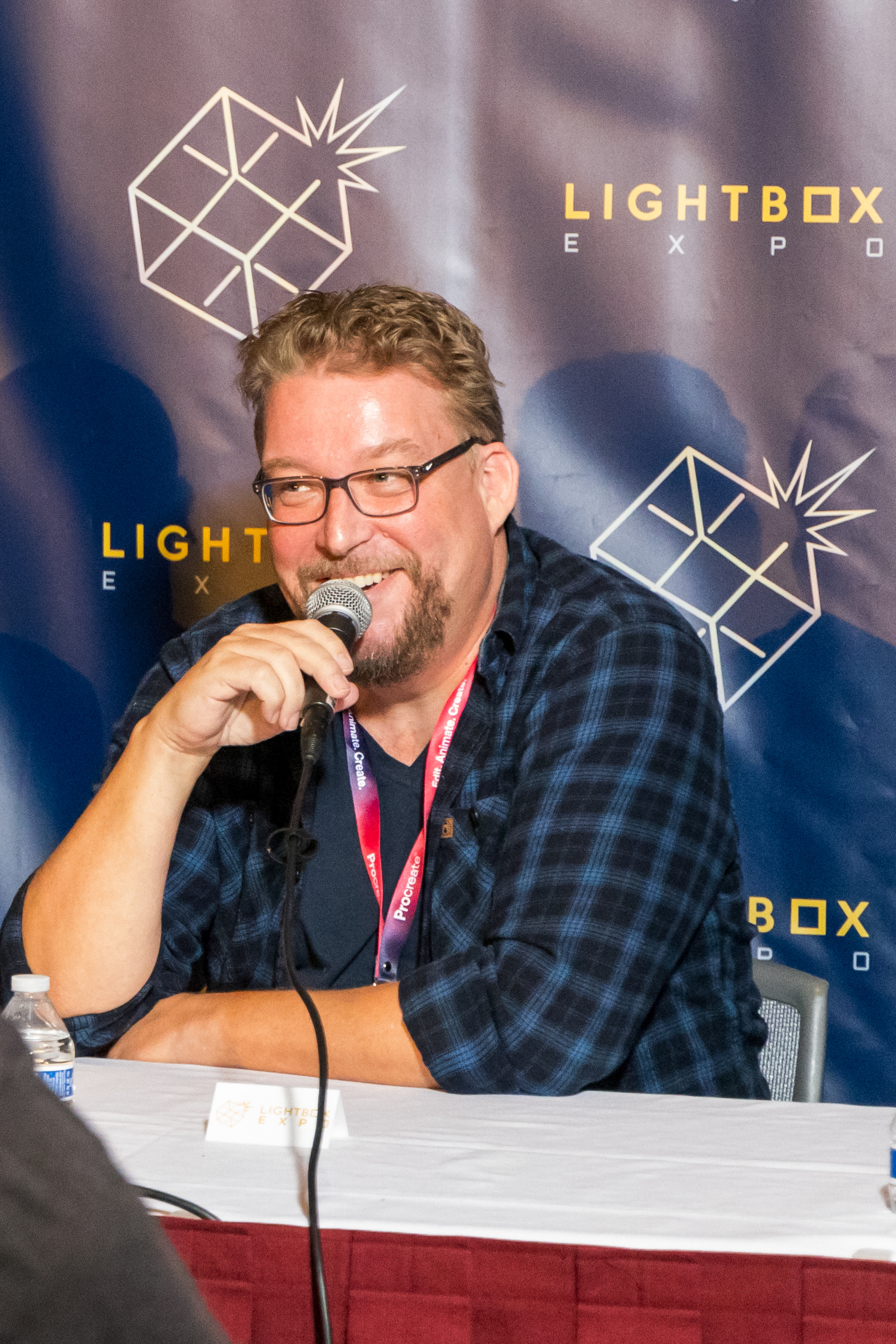
- Aaron Sowd speaking at Lightbox Expo 2023
- Born: November 3, 1970 (age 56)
- Areas: Writer, Penciller, Inker

Aaron Sowd (born November 3, 1970) is an American comic book creator, writer and artist. Sowd began his comic book career as an inker for Top Cow, Marvel Comics, and DC Comics. He currently works as an illustrator and storyboard artist.

== Biography ==
As a storyboard artist, Sowd has worked on Godzilla vs. Kong, Bad Boys for Life, Spider-Man: Far From Home, Michael Bay's Transformers, Ultimate Avengers II, Freddy vs. Jason, Austin Powers in Goldmember, and God of War. As a conceptual designer, Sowd provided designs for Steven Soderbergh and James Cameron's Solaris, as well as Human Nature and Virus.

In animation, Sowd has worked on the style guides for Titan A.E. and Anastasia for 20th Century Fox Animation. Sowd's comic book credits include: 9-11: September 11, 2001 Stories to Remember, Volume 2. Sowd's work has appeared in The New York Times, People, Time, The Hollywood Reporter, Playboy, Gear and PlayStation Magazine.

== Bibliography ==
=== Writer, artist ===
- Komikwerks Volume 1 (Paperback, 2003)
- Komikwerks Presents: Nuts & Bolts (Paperback, 2004)
- Komikwerks Presents: Rockets & Robots (Paperback, 2005)
- Komikwerks Presents: Thrills & Chills (Paperback, 2005)
- Hero Happy Hour Super Special #1 (Paperback, 2005)

=== Inker ===
- 9-11: September 11, 2001 Stories to Remember Volume 2 (DC Comics, 2002)
- Batman #595, 596 (DC Comics)
- Batman: Harley Quinn #1 (DC Comics)
- X-Men # 76 (Marvel Comics)
- Uncanny X-Men #356-357, 360, 362, 365 (Marvel Comics)
- Nightwing: The Target #1 (DC Comics)
- Detective Comics # 746, 747 (DC Comics)
- Batman: No Man's Land Secret Files #1 (DC Comics)
- Batgirl #11 (DC Comics)
- Batman: Legends of The Dark Knight #116 (DC Comics)
- The Batman Chronicles #14, 17, 20 (DC Comics)
- Batman/Toyman #4 (DC Comics)
- Batman: No Man's Land Volume I (DC Comics, Trade Paperback)
- Relative Heroes (DC Comics)
- M-Rex #1, 2, Preview Edition (Image Comics)
- Alpha Flight (vol. 2) #10, 12, 16 (Marvel Comics)
- All Star Comics 80-Page Giant #1 (DC Comics)
- The Flash # 151 (DC Comics)
- Flash Secret Files #3 (DC Comics)
- Ballistic/Wolverine #1 (Marvel/Image Comics)
- Cyblade/Ghost Rider #1 (Marvel/Image Comics)
- Witchblade/Elektra #1 (Marvel/Image Comics)
- Star Trek/X-Men (Marvel/IParamount Comics)
- Medieval Spawn/Witchblade #3 (Image Comics)
- Weapon Zero (limited series) #T-2, T-1 (Image Comics)
- Weapon Zero (regular series) #0, 1-8 (Image Comics)
- Velocity (limited series) # 1-3 (Image Comics)
- Cyberforce Sourcebook # 1, 2 (Image Comics)
- Cyberforce Annual #1 (Image, 1995)
- Witchblade #1/2 (Image Comics/Diamond Exclusive)
- Ripclaw (Wizard special edition) #1/2 (Image, 1995)
- Killrazor #1 (Image Comics)
- Ballistic #3 (Image Comics)
- Cyberforce Origins: Cyblade #1 (Image Comics)
- Ballistic Studios Swimsuit Special #1 (Image Comics)
- Ballistic Studios Lingerie Special #1 (Image Comics)
- Codename: Strykeforce # 8 (Image Comics)
- ShadowHawk # 13, 14 (Image Comics)
- Robotech: Return to Macross #10 (Eternity Comics)
