= World of Quest =

Science fiction comedy cartoon series

- Genre: Science fiction Comedy; Action; Adventure
- Created by: Jason Kruse
- Based on: The World of Quest by Jason Kruse
- Developed by: Stephen Sustarsic & Steve Cuden
- Directed by: Jamie Whitney (season 2)
- Voices of: Ron Pardo; Landon Norris; James Rankin; Kedar Brown; Krystal Meadows; Melissa Altro
- Theme music composer: Voodoo Highway Music
- Opening theme: "World of Quest" by Ron Pardo, Jennifer Hudson and Brian Kelly
- Ending theme: "World of Quest" (instrumental)
- Composers: James Chapple; Brian Pickett; David Kelly; Graeme Cornies
- Countries of origin: United States (S1); Canada
- No. of seasons: 2
- No. of episodes: 26 (50 segments)

Production
- Executive producers: Michael Hirsh; Toper Taylor; John Vandervelde; Stephen Sustarsic; Pamela Slavin
- Producers: Michelle Melanson (S1); Jane Crawford (S2)
- Running time: 20 minutes
- Production companies: Cookie Jar Entertainment; Komikwerks

Original release
- Network: Kids' WB (USA) (S1); Teletoon (Canada)
- Release: March 15, 2008 – June 29, 2009

World of Quest is a science fiction comedy animated television series based on the graphic novel series of the same name by Jason T. Kruse. The series was produced by Cookie Jar Entertainment, in association with Teletoon and Kids' WB!. It appears to be a parody of the fantasy genre that blends swords and sorcery with technology, in the vein of Masters of the Universe. The show premiered on March 15, 2008, on Kids' WB on The CW in the U.S. and in Canada on Teletoon on August 10, 2008, as a preview, with regular airings starting on September 1, 2008. The CW4Kids removed it from its schedule after airing the first-season finale "Search for Power" on June 14, 2008. World of Quest is the last series to be produced for the Kids' WB block.

== Premise ==
The show that focuses on young Prince Nestor on a mission to save his parents, with his amazing muscled protector Quest by his side. To save his parents, Nestor must find the five Swords of Power, which combine to form the Shattersoul Sword.

== Characters ==
Left to right, top to bottom: Quest, Nestor, Gatling, Way, Anna, Graer, Katastrophe, Spite and Ogun

=== Heroes ===
- Quest (voiced by Ron Pardo) is a strong, 1,900 year old warrior with an odd past. Previously, he was assigned as a nurse for baby Nestor. Quest refuses to help Nestor until Nestor tricks him into activating an allegiance spell that binds him to the prince.
- Nestor (voiced by Landon Norris) is the Prince of Odyssea, son of the King and Queen of Odyssea, who have been captured. Even though he orders Quest around and calls him his "bodyguard", Quest usually ends up interpreting Nestor's orders to suit his needs.
- Graer (voiced by Ron Pardo) is a thieving griffin with an appetite and Nestor's companion. He appears to be old friends with Quest.
- Gatling (voiced by Kedar Brown) is a cyborg from the town Effluviu. He is able to chew bits of metal and spit them out like bullets.
- Way (voiced by Melissa Altro) is a shapeshifting creature with patterns on her body resembling circuits, Way always speaks in enigmatic riddles, although she is helpful. She has an intricate knowledge of the world of Odyssea, and often functions as both map and guide to Quest, Nestor, and company.
- Anna Maht (voiced by Krystal Meadows) is a young sorceress who is a huge fan of Quest and adores the warrior, despite him not caring for her affections at all. Anna often boasts to be capable of casting a variety of spells, but they usually fail or have different results than intended. The one spell she can cast to great effect, though, is one that brings inanimate objects or plants to life.
- Albert: A gigantic green creature resembling a cross between an armadillo and an ankylosaur with purple armor, Albert is used as a method of transportation by the team. Nestor and Quest usually travel in the 'mace' at the end of Albert's tail, which functions as a sort of cockpit. Albert can roll into a ball to escape hairy situations, but this leaves his passengers quite dazed. He is the only thing Quest likes and calls him the most important member of the group.

=== Villains ===
- The Guardian: The guardian of the Shattersoul Sword. Quest challenges the Guardian to a duel for the Shattersoul Sword, but loses and is forced to hand over Albert. However, Quest refuses to let his foe take his best friend and secretly hides underneath Albert while the Guardian unwittingly leads him to his lair, this leads to a second battle which Quest wins by smashing the Guardian's snow globe collection, giving him a massive advantage. The Guardian, however, refuses to surrender the Shattersoul Sword and they both run for it. During their struggle, the sword winds up splitting back into five and although Quest succeeds in taking some, the Guardian manages to get the rest.
- Lord Spite (voiced by James Rankin) is an evil overlord who has plans of world domination, but always fails due to his bumbling underlings as well as his own incompetence and cowardice. He looks vaguely reptilian with green skin and a large horn on his head. Spite has a flair for dramatics, and spends more time coming up with puns to use against Quest than on actual plans. Besides having a huge army of Growls and Grinders as well as commanding the living fortress of Mollox, he is a sorcerer of no small power and can also remove his right eye to use as a scrying ball.
- Ogun (voiced by Kedar Brown) is a former Rouster like Quest who turned evil because he felt unappreciated by the royal family, with the last straw being denied the title of Nestor's nanny. He wears armor resembling a skull with a skull-like head/helmet. Ogun often eats minions Lord Spite discards by sucking them into the black hole inside the mouth.
- The Katastrophe Brothers: Lord Spite's three henchmen: Khaos the Minotaur (voiced by Ron Pardo), Kalamity the Vulture (voiced by James Rankin), and Konfusion the Lizard (voiced by Kedar Brown). Whenever they come in contact with water, the Katastrophe Brothers merge into a giant hybrid creature known as "Katastrophe"; the only way to change them back is to pull Katastrophe's ponytail. The three are quite useless, and normally rather try to shirk their duties and come up with explanations on why they could not capture Nestor.
- Deceit (voiced by Melissa Altro) is a witch in service to Lord Spite, Deceit hovers above the ground and has a hat with a living snake on it. Spite often summons her to help him in his plans to capture the swords, although Deceit has a tendency to double-cross him.

=== Creatures ===
- Grinders: Large, green, four-legged, rhino-like creatures with four eyes, one horn, and a huge mouth full of teeth, who can become alive if separated from their body.
- Growls: Small, grey, goblin-like creatures that run on two legs and have fangs, a Mohawk-esque tuft of hair, and pierced ears.
- Sea Squawkers: Small critters with nasty-biting beaks that live in Quest's moat as well as in small ponds throughout Odyssea.
- Stumps: Sawed-off logs with arms and legs and glowing red eyes. They hurl balls of tree sap.
- Swampy Crabby Swamp Creatures: Large, green, crab-like creatures that live in swamps.
- Loberman Pinchers: Green, dog-like creatures with purple shells on their backs and scorpion tails with a pinching claw at the end.
- Lucky: Quest's tiny, but extremely vicious dog. It is a pure-bred, grinder-spaniel, resembling a ball of green fur with a giant toothy mouth and four stick-like legs. He was given as a gift by Quest for Lord Spite.
- Lipsuckers: Large, slug-like creatures with giant kissing lips.
- Super Hopasaurus Rex: A cross between a Tyrannosaurus and a kangaroo. It was created by Spite to destroy Quest, but ends up treating Quest as a son.
- Tremordites - Giant, horrible-smelling, sand worms that protect Dust Devil Ravine. They are blind and use the hair on their bodies to see.
- Gatling's Adopted Mother: A half-cat/kangaroo woman with cat ears and whiskers.
- Croc-a-Doodle-Doo: A purple-coloured, troll-like creature with a tuft of hair on its forehead.
- The Toe-Jamemers of the Fjord of Fowl Funky Fungus: Fowl-smelling creatures that inhabit the Fjord. They also have serious problems with foot infections, particularly athlete's foot.
- Ding Bats: Large, purple-coloured, bat-like creatures with long legs, big green eyes, and large fangs.
- Suckers: Creatures resembling blood-sucking, flying scorpions. Gatling defeats by spraying with a can of what seems to be 'sucker-repellent'.
- Wall of Insults: A mean, rock wall that shrinks and crumbles as it is insulted.
- Acorn: A creature resembling an acorn with jagged teeth.
- Siamese Uberilla: A giant gorilla with two heads, each head having one eye.
- Mountain: A living mountain that was inadvertently awakened by Quest and company.
- Craggy-Tongue Toe-Lickers: Furry, green-winged creatures with large tongues and huge eyes. They also have small bird-like feet.
- Sprowls: Small, horned, grey-coloured creatures with an appearance similar to Lord Spite.
- Spinders/Grintes: Creatures that were created from grinders and one of Spite's nose hairs. They are green with a lighter-shaded tuft of hair around their horn.
- Giant Frog-Bat: Huge, long-tongued monsters with webbed wings and clawed feet. They have small eyes protruding from its head, and use their tongues to attack.
- Shriek: A frilled lizard-like species known to produce high-pitched shrieks. Their society considers themselves quite civilized, yet they quickly blame even minor inconveniences on witches, whom they toss down to a pit as a test for.

== Crew ==
- Michelle Melanson - Producer
- Ria Westaway - Producer
- Jane Crawford - Producer
- Paul Brown - Director
- Jamie Whitney - Director
- Stephen Sustarsic - Executive producer, writer
- Jason Kruse - Creator, creative consultant, writer
- Shannon Eric Denton - Associate producer, writer
- Steve Cuden - Writer
- Mark Zaslove - Writer
- Charleen Easton - Writer
- David Silverman - Writer
- Dean Stefan - Writer
- Susan Hart - Voice director
- Jessie Thomson - Voice director

== Episodes ==
=== Season 1 (2008) ===
No.	Title	Directed by	Written by	Original CAN. air date	Original U.S. air date	Prod. code
1	"The Quest Begins" "The Not-So-Great Escape"	Paul Brown	Stephen Sustarsic Steve Cuden	August 10, 2008	March 15, 2008	101
"The Quest Begins": Prince Nestor and his Griffin companion Graer flee the Katastrophe brothers as they search for Quest. The Katastrophe Brothers serve the evil Lord Spite. Graer is Quest's former partner. Nestor's mother banished Quest from the kingdom at some point. Nestor explains to Quest that his parents have been captured and he needs to find the Shatter Soul Sword so he can rescue them. Quest refuses to help but Nestor tricks him into reading an allegiance spell that binds him to aid the prince. "The Not-So-Great Escape": Nestor, Quest and Graer travel to the town of Effluvium seeking Gatling. Gatling knows where to find the Dagger of Way which will lead Nestor to the five swords which make up the Shatter Soul Sword. They are promptly arrested for stepping on the grass, one of many crazy laws in the town. They get thrown into prison where they find Gatling, a cyborg whom Quest blames for his banishment. It turns out that the town is on the back of an enormous monster, and the prisoners are food for the creature. They escape and Gatling joins them on their quest.
2	"Between a Rock and a Hard Place" "Bottoms Up"	Paul Brown	Stephen Sustarsic David Silverman	September 2, 2008	March 22, 2008	102
"Between a Rock and a Hard Place": Nestor and Quest encounter some talking rocks who claim to know the location of the Dagger of Way. They're lying. "Bottoms Up": Later, Nestor discovers the map to the Dagger of Way and accidentally imprints it on his butt. Many butt jokes ensue, but Nestor and his crew eventually discover the dagger and free the navigator Way, who joins them on their quest.
3	"The Hills are Alive with the Sound of Anna Maht" "Where There's a Way"	Paul Brown	Mark Zaslove Stephen Sustarsic	September 3, 2008	March 29, 2008	103
"The Hills are Alive with the Sound of Anna Maht": The crew encounters the Sorceress Anna Maht, who turns out to be a gushing, teenage fangirl for Quest. Anna brings a mountain to life as a giant dog-like critter that won't leave them alone. In the Valley of Arms, Anna helps Nestor recover the sword of Earth, but it still needs to be activated. Anna joins the crew. "Where There's a Way": Way leads the crew into a swamp where they encounter monsters. Nestor accuses her of being a bad navigator. Feeling unwanted, Way quits the crew. Lord Spite captures her along with Gatling. The crew raids Castle Mollux and rescues them.
4	"Croc-a-Doodle-Doo" "Tournament of Punishment"	Paul Brown	Charleen Easton Mark Zaslove	September 4, 2008	April 5, 2008	104
"Croc-a-Doodle-Doo": Way reveals that Nestor can activate the Earth Sword by battling the Crocadoodle-Doo monster. They travel to Crocadoodle Ville, a Vegas-like tourist town in the middle of a swamp. They find the creature, who is nothing more than a goofy pushover. He helps Nestor activate the sword. Later the gang helps the monster to leave the town. D: Paul Brown, W: Charleen Easton. "Tournament of Punishment": Way tells the gang that the sword of Fire can be found at the Palace of Punishment, a dark, scary castle. There's an annual criminal tournament there and the sword is the grand prize. Quest and Graer enter the tournament. Just as they are about to win, the grandmaster recognizes Graer as an old enemy and he is disqualified. Nestor takes over as Quest's fighting partner and they defeat the grand champion. Nestor claims the fire sword.
5	"No Prophet No Gain" "Trial of Anna Maht"	Jamie Whitney Paul Brown	Steve Cuden Stephen Sustarsic	September 5, 2008	April 19, 2008	105
"No Prophet, No Gain": The crew encounters the prophet Augie, (who Anna Maht idolizes) who they hope will lead them to the next sword, because Way has a cold and can't show the way . He's on the run from the Wrath King's soldiers. Augie leads the crew into a series of bad encounters without any sign of the next sword. Quest deduces that Augie is a terrible prophet who is cursed with bad luck. That same bad luck has kept the Wrath King from conquering all of Odyssia. Augie agrees to return to the Wrath King and continue to thwart his plans. "The Trial of Anna Maht": The crew has to pass through the valley of the Shrieks, lizard like civilized creatures. In an attempt to conjure up some food, Anna Maht brings the forest trees to life. The Shrieks come, arrest Anna and take her to the Republic of Shriek. She must pay "the ultimate price" for being a witch, but first she gets a trial, which involves being thrown into a lake with "the creature that goes urk". The crew rescues Anna from being hurled into the lake. D: Paul Brown, W: Stephen Sustarsic. Note: The trials are loosely based on the Salem Witch trial in which women thought to be "witches" were weighted down and thrown into a lake. In that time, a "normal person" would drown, but a "witch" would survive.
6	"Death by Mockery" "Lanze the Boil"	Paul Brown Jamie Whitney	David Silverman Dean Stefan	September 8, 2008	April 26, 2008	106
"Death by Mockery": The crew seeks the Chamber of Fire in order to activate the fire sword. The Chamber of Fire lies within a volcano, past the Crater of Mockery. In the crater, the walls come to life and continuously insult Nestor and his crew. Lord Spite, General Ogun and the Katastrophe Brothers follow them in. The good guys activate the sword and escape the volcano. "Lanze the Boil": The crew begins searching for the water sword. The pass through the giant corn maze, outwit a pair of Loberman Pinchers and arrive at Mr. Jim's town. Mr. Jim tries to drive them away to protect his town's dust mine. Unable to stop the crew, he calls the local "puss officer", Lanze the Boil, a grotesque character covered with puss-filled boils that come to life as his posse. The crew falls into the Dust Mine. Quest cures Lanze of his boils, so Lanze reveals the location of the Water Sword. All this time Nestor and Quest are arguing what is better — Quest for brains and Nestor for muscles.
7	"Rolling Nestor Gathers No Moss" "Mini Quest"	Paul Brown	Mark Zaslove	October 3, 2008	May 3, 2008	107
"Rolling Nestor Gathers No Moss": In the forest of the Unforgiven, Anna Maht tries to bring a tree to life to ask for directions. It's a mirror tree so the spell bounces off the tree, reverses, and turns Nestor into stone. Quest takes the opportunity to quit the adventure, leaving Gatling in charge. Quest and Graer end up in the carnival-like town of Deludium. Quest finds Doctor Demise (a frog-like guy who runs a kennel) who is holding his dog. Quest realizes he misses Nestor and the crew. Meanwhile, Gatling finds the Water of Better, which partially frees Nestor, until Albert drinks the rest. Spite and Ogun show up and kidnap Nestor and the crew to castle Mollux. From their prison cell, the crew feeds Albert a bunch of onions so he cries out the Water of Better and frees Nestor. Quest and Graer go to Spite's castle and release Lucky, the dog, who eats all of Spite's growls and grinders. "Mini Quest": We find the crew battling with a horde of Lipsuckers. During the battle, Quest falls into the Lake of Little and shrinks down to only 5 inches tall. Spite learns of this and unleashes the Super Hopasaurus Rex. The crew goes looking for the Orb of the Conquerors to restore Quest to full size. The Hopasaurus finds them but they escape. They meet the keeper of the Orb who challenges them to a quiz which turns out to be ridiculously easy, except 1 extremely hard one, whom Graer gets it right. The Hopasaurus finds them again and swallows the Orb. Quest jumps into its mouth and chases the Orb down to its stomach. Quest gets the Orb and wishes to be big, but nothing happens. Quest breaks the Orb like an egg, releasing some gas which makes him grow large. He emerges in the Hopasaurus' baby pocket, so the creature loves him as if he were its baby.
8	"In Search of the Royal Family" "As the Superworm Turns"	Jamie Whitney	Steve Cuden	October 10, 2008	May 10, 2008	108
"In Search of the Royal Family": Nestor recovers the Aqua Diamond which activates the Water Sword. At the behest of Lord Spite, Deceit captures Anna Maht, takes her form and infiltrates the group. She promises to lead them to Nestor's parent's, the King and Queen. Nestor's parents claim they are not prisoners, but that they willingly capitulated to Lord Spite and are instead retired. Quest sees through the ruse, helps Anna escape and gets Nestor to resume the Quest. "As the Superworm Turns": The heroes look for the Air Sword in the Real Super Great Canyon, or more specifically in Dust Devil Ravine, which is inhabited by giant carnivorous worms called Tremordites. However, Nestor realizes the Superworm is just protecting its young. Underground, they find the Air Sword and Nestor realizes the Worm is their best hope for getting back to the surface. They capture the sword and Quest actually congratulates Nestor, for once.
9	"Fall of Odyssia"	Jamie Whitney	Story by : Shannon Eric Denton (part 1); Jason Kruse (part 2); Teleplay by : Shannon Eric Denton (part 1); Stephen Sustarsic (part 2)	October 17, 2008	May 17, 2008	109
While looking for water, the heroes enter the Valley of Sorrows, whose mists cause them to relive their worst regrets. We get to see mistakes from the past of Graer, Anna, Gatling and Nestor. Way is inside her dagger, and Quest arrives later. Affected by the mist, Quest relives his past. We find out that he's an amnesiac with no memory before he arrived in Odyssia. He was made Royal Nanny to Nestor, then just a baby, which made General Ogun so jealous, he joined the evil Lord Shadowseed (presumably prior to becoming henchman to Lord Spite). Quest, Gatling and Graer rescue Nestor from Shadowseed, but the Queen still banishes him for failing to prevent his kidnapping.
10	"Rash to Judgement" "Harvest Day"	Paul Brown Jamie Whitney	Charleen Easton Stephen Sustarsic	November 30, 2008	May 24, 2008	110
"Rash to Judgement": Looking for clues on how to activate the Air Sword, the heroes go to the Bed of Toenails, where Nestor gets a rash from the toenail fungus. They are directed to find a map, but find two instead. Ogun steals one of the maps, but Nestor's rash (which can talk) reveals the maps can only be read with its dust. "Harvest Day": The heroes have found and activated the Earth, Fire, Water, and Air swords, so they decide to celebrate before they search for the Energy sword, by going to a Harvest festival. During the celebration, Nestor finds an old friend of his (a jester) and gets him to join the group on their quest. The jester is working for Spite however, and traps the heroes in a cage made of energy. Spite then steals the Earth, Water, and Air swords and escapes. The group get out of the cage and discover their quest is far from over.
11	"Left Holding the Bag" "War of the Griffins"	Paul Brown Jamie Whitney	Joel Metzger Mark Zaslove	December 7, 2008	May 31, 2008	111
"Left Holding the Bag": The group finds a bag with a note promising a reward for its return but warning that it should not be opened. Naturally, they open it out of curiosity, and are sucked inside. (Note: this episode is a humorous reference to the magic item known as a bag of holding.) "War of the Griffins": Graer gets summoned back to his native land, since there is a war going on among the griffins- and it turns out that he is their king! However, the "war" turns out to be a sports event, and Graer was king only for its duration.
12	"Night of the Hunter" "World of Carney"	Paul Brown Jamie Whitney	Steve Cuden Ray Delaurantis	December 14, 2008	June 7, 2008	112
"Night of the Hunter": Agon, a bounty hunter whom Quest is actually afraid of, captures Graer, and Nestor must convince Quest to go rescue him. Egon wants a fair fight with Quest, who once accused him of cheating (even though he did). Nestor solves the situation by paying Egon to capture Spite instead. "World of Carney": The heroes meet some carnival folk who turn out to be Gatling's adoptive parents (he ran away from them because they are thieves.) The carnies apparently betray the heroes to Lord Spite, but it turns out to be a trick to recover the stolen swords.
13	"Search for Power"	Paul Brown (part 1); Jamie Whitney (part 2)	Mark Zaslove (part 1); Stephen Sustarsic (part 2)	December 28, 2008	June 14, 2008	113
The heroes find the final sword (the Energy Sword) but lose all the swords (and Prince Nestor) to Deceit, who tricks him by appealing to his impulsive desire to play the hero. Nestor seems to escape from the villains on his own, but he doesn't realize Deceit let him go- with the 5 swords hidden magically inside one of his teeth, so she can collect them for herself later. But Nestor loses the tooth, none the wiser.

=== Season 2 (2009) ===
No. overall	No. in season	Title	Directed by	Written by	Original CAN. air date	Original U.S. air date	Prod. code
14	1	"The Search for Deceit" "Mystical Tooth Fairy"	Jamie Whitney	Stephen Sustarsic	March 8, 2009	June 4, 2009	201
"The Search for Deceit": Finally, the gang is on Deceit's trail. After breaking into her house, they are ambushed by Spite. Everything turns worse when the two villains can't find the enchanted tooth that's supposed to be in Nestor's mouth. "Mystical Tooth Fairy": Anna calls her old roommate, now a tooth fairy, for help. Unfortunately, during her visit Anna, understands (after turning Quest, Graer and Gatling into turkeys) that her magic is nothing compared with her friend's magic. Later, after convincing (with a bit of lie) Anna that her magic is useful, the gang finds Nestor's tooth, but the swords are taken away by The Guardian.
15	2	"Robin Hood of Odyssia" "The Tell Tale Tale Teller"	Jamie Whitney	Mark Zaslove	March 15, 2009	June 12, 2009	202
"The Tell Tale Tale Teller": Lord Spite tells his bard that he has defeated Quest several times, yet Ogun out of jealousy says that maybe he should beat Quest again. When they find Quest and the gang the bard notices that Quest is a great warrior and leaves to sing Quests praises. After several irritating songs Deceit realizes that they can find Quest using the brad and then ambush him. Later the bard thinks that Deceit is a great sorceress and leaves to sing her praises. An annoyed Deceit turns him into a something without vocal cords—a snake. "Robin Hood of Odyssia": Lord Spite convinces Graer's sister (who is trying to steal from the rich and give to the poor) that Grear, Quest, Nestor, Gatling and Anna are rich, and don't deserve their riches. So, late at night, she sneaks into their camp and steals everything—from their weapons to the dagger of Way. When the gang wakes up, they soon realize that Graer's sister has tied them up together, and left in their underwear. While Robin goes back to give to the poor (who are really gatlings in disguise as peasants), Lord Spite decides he does not trust Robin anymore and decides to double-cross her. As she and the others are captured and imprisoned, she realizes that she and Graer always fight and should act as brother and sister. They decided to work together to fight Lord Spite, who is on his own fighting since his henchmen, including Udon are on strike until they get some riches of their own.
16	3	"The Crusades" "Little Troll Down the Lane"	Jamie Whitney	Steve Cuden Joel Metzger	March 22, 2009	June 15, 2009	203
"The Crusades": Nestor persuades his team (except Quest) to join a battle with green bull creatures. But later, the gang finds out that they have to fight a defenseless village full of hippy rats. Now they must protect the village from the crusaders. "Little Troll Down The Lane": After Nestor gets a monster angry at them because he didn't forfeit a softball game, the gang finds a troll who has been cursed. Quest must kiss her to release her from it, yet he can't because she is really ugly. After the cursed woman kidnaps Anna and Graer, Nestor reminds his bodyguard that sometimes one must do something for the good of the team...
17	4	"Mirror Quest" "Leaper Island"	Jamie Whitney	Dave Dias Ray Delaurentis	April 4, 2009	June 16, 2009	204
"Mirror Quest": Quest gets caught in the crossfire and gets hit with not only the ray of beasts who can split you in two just by looking at you, but with Deceit's magic as well. This causes Quest to be split into two Quests - a good Quest and an evil Quest. Evil Quest soon finds castle Mulox and ends up defeating Deceit, Ogun and Spite all at once. He takes over castle Mulox and now commands Spite's army (grinders and growls). Later, in a confrontation with evil Quest, good Quest manages to grab a hold of evil Quest with a giant hug (while Spite tapes it, saying it's "blackmail"), and Anna puts the two Quests back together. Yet, when normal Quest learns that Spite has video taped the hug, he has nothing more to say except "I hate the good me". "Leaper Island": While fighting leaper monkeys Anna gets scratched by one. Later at the border they find shrieks that are stopping people to scan them for a new disease called "leapers". Unfortunately, since Anna has the disease, she is captured and taken to leaper island where all people who have leapers are isolated from the world. Yet, she is the only one isolated...could it all be another of Lord Spite's fiendish traps?
18	5	"Musta Been Something Graer Ate" "The Great Rutabaga Depress"	Jamie Whitney	Mark Zaslove Brad Birch	April 11, 2009	June 17, 2009	205
"Musta Been Something Graer Ate": At another battle against Spite Graer is tricked into eating some food which is actually a trap. After Graer understands that his stomach is full of parasites who can eat him alive Anna makes Nestor, Quest and Gatling small enough to get into Graer's system to fight off munchers (brown bunnies with sharp teeth). Yet, here's another problem—general Ogun also gets into Graer's body... "The Great Rutabaga Depression": The whole of Odyssia is in crisis. Someone has stolen all the rutabaga. And unfortunately for Quest, it's Agon! But, he must defeat the bounty hunter if he wants to get information from a man who apparently knows where the Guardian went.
19	6	"There's Something About Gatling" "The Tow"	Jamie Whitney	David Silverman Charleen Easton	April 18, 2009	June 18, 2009	206
"There's Something About Gatling": Gatling has lost control over his cyborg side and has no idea what's he doing. To make matters worse, Graer accidentally releases him—he is free to make chaos. Later, Quest makes a plan to make Gatling fight castle Molux. "The Tow": Due to the fault of Nestor, Albert has been towed. In order to free him, he must become mayor of a city called Clagbush. This "city", however, has only one inhabitant, who wants to be the mayor himself.
20	7	"Katastrophic Storm" "World of Water"	Jamie Whitney	Sean Jara Erika Strobel	April 25, 2009	June 19, 2009	207
"Katastrophic Storm": Deceit persuades the Katastrophe brothers to help her catch Way. Every time the Katastrophe monster is defeated, the rain which Deceit creates makes it even more powerful. The only way to save the day is for Anna to stop the rain, which is a really hard thing for her to do. "World of Water": During a fight with the Guardian, the gang falls into the ocean. There, they make friends with sea monkeys who worship Graer. Unfortunately, when it's time to go, the creatures don't want to release them.
21	8	"Molting Graer" "The Body Switch"	Jamie Whitney	Howard Nemetz Mary Crawford & Alan Templeton	May 2, 2009	June 22, 2009	208
"Molting Graer": In a battle with living rocks, Anna accidentally makes a spell on Graer, which makes him lose all his feathers. The only way to help him grow feathers back is to make Graer a hero. The gang desperately tries to do that, but all changes when real trouble appears. "The Body Switch": During a battle, Anna and Deceit accidentally hit Nestor and Quest, which makes them both switch bodies. Everything turns for the worse when Spite kidnaps Nestor, hoping to set a trap for the Guardian. In the end, Nestor (with Quest's body) breaks free of the trap, and the two return to normal by eating a magical, very bad-tasting fish.
22	9	"Guardian Match" "No Way Out"	Jamie Whitney	Dave Diaz Mary Crawford & Alan Templeton	May 9, 2009	June 23, 2009	209
"Guardian Match": Quest meets the Guardian, and to make things a bit interesting, they make a bet—if Quest loses, he loses Albert, and if the Guardian loses, the Guardian gives up the sword. Quest loses and Albert is taken away. Yet, unwilling to lose a friend, Quest alone tracks the Guardian to his home and battles him once more. "No Way Out": Spite gets a gun which can "babytise" anything. During a fight with Quest and his crew, Spite accidentally (due to Nestor) hits Way, and she becomes an egg. The gang must find her family so that her mom can hatch her.
23	10	"Happy Birthday Nestor" "Take a Chance"	Jamie Whitney	Marley Harrill Brad Birch	May 16, 2009	June 24, 2009	210
"Happy Birthday Nestor": For Nestor's birthday, everyone gives him a gift; Gatling gives him one of his eyes, Graer gives some of his feathers, Albert gives him a bunch of different paws in colored paint, and even Quest promises that he won't call him "runt". Anna gives him a spell that will make his birthday wish come true. Nestor wishes for superpowers for his birthday, and after he defeats lord Spite and general Ogun, the prince sees that he can just defeat the Guardian alone and tells the others to leave. But while Nestor flies off to defeat lord Spite to get the rest of the swords, his powers vanish and he is captured by lord Spite. The gang saves him, and later Anna reveals that he only wished for powers for his birthday, not forever. "Take a Chance": While walking through a desert, the team gets trapped in a game show with Lord Spite. If they compete and win, they get to cut through the desert, and they will be told where the Guardian is. But if they fail to win, they will be captured and forced to live in the city of chance forever.
24	11	"Witches of Odyssia" "War of the Vegivours"	Jamie Whitney	Erika Strobel Sean Jara	May 23, 2009	June 25, 2009	211
"Witches of Odyssia": Anna has been captured by the shrieks again. But when the rest of the team comes to save her, it turns out that the shrieks now love witches and are making a witch contest in which Anna participates. Yet, it turns out to be another one of Spite's plans in which he has stolen all the power from the sorceresses... "War of the Vegivours": Nestor has insulted a swarm of French bees who fly away, leaving the land unprotected. In the morning, an army of vegetables, the enemy of the bees, made an ambush and captured almost the whole gang. Nestor can't fight off a whole army, so he has to do the last thing a prince should do—apologise...
25	12	"Bizarro Graer" "Unlikely Alliance"	Jamie Whitney	Jason T. Kruse & Shannon Eric Denton Brad Birch	May 30, 2009	June 26, 2009	212
"Bizarro Graer": Deceit makes a clone of Graer by casting a spell on a frog, hoping that it will steal the swords. After Graer is captured, the clone takes his place, though it becomes more froglike over time. After the truth is revealed, the gang not only has to fight the Bizarro Graer, but also its mutant hatchlings. "Unlikely Alliance": Spite pays Agon to fight the Guardian for the swords, but Agon loses. Nestor interrupts the fight to save Agon, with the belief that doing so is the noble thing to do, but ends up losing the Fire Sword. Later, the gang falls into a trap set by Spite, and Nestor and Quest must battle the Guardian. Agon comes at the last minute to save them and thank them for the help earlier, reminding the group that they are still on his bad side.
26	13	"The Prince and the Pauper" "Strange Bedfellows"	Jamie Whitney	Sean Jara Stephen Sustarsic	June 6, 2009	June 29, 2009	213
"The Prince and the Pauper": Everyone is in shock when it turns out that Nestor isn't a prince after all. It was a mix up; the real prince is Bestor, and Nestor is actually a cobbler. Soon afterwards, feeling unwanted, Nestor considers leaving the team... "Strange Bedfellows": In a battle with both Spite and the Guardian, with Spite and his henchmen on the sidelines, a mountain is accidentally brought to life. It doesn't care who's good or bad. It eats them all and tries to digest them. In the end, all escape the mountain. However, all five swords are lost in different directions, so the gang must find them once more (as Quest said, "This quest will never end!").

== Telecast and home media ==
World of Quest premiered on March 15, 2008, on Kids' WB on The CW in the U.S. and in Canada on Teletoon on August 10, 2008, as a preview, with regular airings starting on September 1, 2008. The CW4Kids removed it from its schedule after airing the first-season finale "Search For Power" on June 14, 2008.

The series aired on Teletoon in Canada and Cartoon Network in the United Kingdom.

In March 2010, Cookie Jar Entertainment announced a deal with Mill Creek Entertainment to release their shows, including World of Quest on the home entertainment market in the U.S.

On July 27, 2010, Mill Creek Entertainment released a 10-episode Best-of collection entitled World of Quest: The Quest Begins on DVD in Region 1 which includes a bonus episode of Super Duper Sumos.

== Awards ==
The series was nominated for Best Children's and Youth Program or Series by the Canadian Film and Television Production Association for their 2009 Indie Awards.

== See also ==
- The World of Quest
