= Kate Lambert =

British-American model (born 1983)

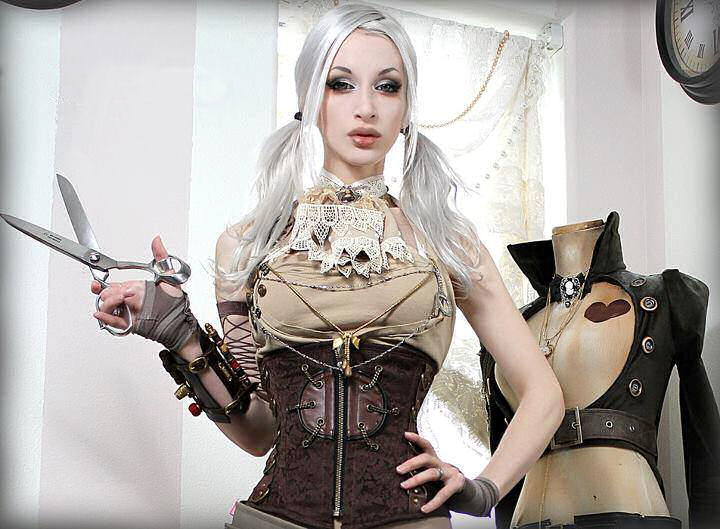
- Born: 16 September 1983 (age 43); Wales, United Kingdom
- Other name: Kato
- Occupations: Fashion model; Fashion designer; singer; entrepreneur
- Known for: Steampunk modeling; Steampunk Couture; Steamgirl; Stylerotica; DK-Zero (band)
- Label: Steampunk Couture
- Father: Terence Lambert
- Website: steampunkcouture.com, http://www.steamgirl.com

Kate Lambert (born 1983), known professionally as Kato, is a British model, fashion designer, singer and entrepreneur. A native of Wales, Kato emigrated to the United States in 2007. She became a US citizen in 2019.

One of the most recognisable faces of the steampunk community, Kato has been called "the supermodel of steampunk" and steampunk's "it" girl. Steampunk comic heroine Lady Mechanika was inspired by her look, and her work has been featured in several books on steampunk art and fashion including International Steampunk Fashions, where her photo is featured prominently on the cover.

Kato was also on the cover of the August 2014 issue of Bizarre Magazine, which referred to her as a "steampunk idol" and "pin-up legend". She also appeared on the cover of the Spring 2012 issue of FEY Magazine, and also the covers of September 2012 Ladies of Steampunk and April 2013 LoSP Bronze Age (NSFW) magazines. In July 2016 she was on the cover of Phantasm Magazine's steampunk issue, where she was referred to as "The Queen of Steam".

Kato is a frequent guest speaker at steampunk conventions, most recently Wild Wild West Con in Tucson, Arizona and Salt City Steamfest in Salt Lake City, Utah.

== Background ==
Kato is the third of four daughters born to wildlife painter Terence Lambert and his wife, a school headmistress and principal. She grew up in a Victorian rectory behind a 13th-century cemetery, and credits this for her love of Victorian style. She left school at 16 and finished her final two years at a tech college where she could specialise in fine art. She then went on to complete a course in fashion and textiles at the South West Wales School of Art in Carmarthen. After graduating she launched her first business, called Moshka, where she made and sold dread hair falls online and at craft fairs and markets throughout Wales.

== Career ==
=== Modelling and inspiration ===
Early in her modelling career, Kato modelled for Toxico clothing with Ulorin Vex, and later with Chad Michael Ward. In 2004 she began designing and making outfits that had a Neo-Victorian and post-apocalyptic vibe, then modelled them herself and posted them on MySpace. Her inspiration at that time was the 1800s meets Mad Max and Tank Girl, but she did not know what to call her style until former Abney Park vocalist Magdalene Veen noticed her work and pointed out "how Steampunk" her illustrations and style were.

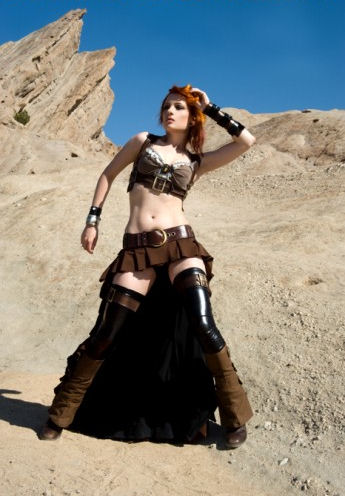
Model Ulorin Vex wearing post-apocalyptic steampunk attire designed by Kato.

=== Fashion design ===
In 2007, Kato founded the first steampunk clothing company, "Steampunk Couture", producing high-quality, custom-fit clothing and accessories catering specifically to the steampunk genre. Her designs incorporate post-apocalyptic and tribal influences as well as sci-fi, shabby chic and Harajuku/Mori girl elements. One of her more popular ensembles, the "Vex" outfit, was named after model Ulorin Vex, who modelled it on the Steampunk Couture website.

In 2006, Kato, then head of steampunk/industrial musician Doctor Steel's fan club, the "Army of Toy Soldiers", founded Toy Soldiers Unite!, the club's website. Besides running the site as "Sergeant Kato", she also designed all the club's uniforms, as well as creating the security guard and nurse uniforms worn by Steel's stage performers. In 2011, when Dr. Steel retired, Kato turned over control of Toy Soldiers Unite to its current administrators.

In 2010, Kato designed the outfit for the character "Enki" in John Soares' dieselpunk action series, The Danger Element, as well as playing the voice of the car, the "Jitnimobile". In 2013, Flirty Girl Collectibles issued a 1/6 scale collectible action figure of her wearing the "Vex" outfit.

In 2014, her Steampunk Couture clothing line became available through DraculaClothing. She also consolidated all her businesses and clothing lines under the S Corporation name, "Lambee Co.", and teamed with fashion designer Vera Iam to create two lines of shoes and boots.

=== Other projects ===
In 2013, Kato started Steamgirl LLC, a multi-media neo-Victorian fashion erotica site and the first subscription site for steampunk erotica. Besides designing the clothing the models on her site wear, she also builds steampunk and neo-Victorian furniture, props, and hardware as well as doing all the hair and makeup for the shoots. Kato is also a writer for Ladies of Steampunk and LoSP Bronze Age magazines, and was featured in LoSP's premiere issue. She also teamed with photographer Chloe Barcelou and launched Mori Girl Clothing, the first Mori Kei clothing company outside Japan.

In August 2015, Kato became one of the official judges of the GSN reality television game show series Steampunk'd.

=== DK-Zero ===
In July 2017 Kato formed a punk/industrial band, "DK-Zero", with Derek Brown of Abney Park. In 2018 they released their debut album, From Nothing. Her band took the main stage at Wave Gotik Treffen in 2019, and was also a headliner at Wasteland Weekend later that year. She is no longer with the band.
