= Steamcon =

Former steampunk convention in Seattle

- Official Steamcon Logo
- Status: Inactive
- Genre: Steampunk
- Venue: Bellevue Hyatt Regency
- Locations: Bellevue, Washington
- Country: USA
- Organizer: Steampunk Conventions
- Website: http://www.steamcon.org/

Steamcon was one of the largest steampunk conventions/symposia in the United States. Located in the Seattle area of Washington state, Steamcon held its first symposium in 2009.

Steamcon grew out of the desire of its founders to host a steampunk event in greater Seattle. The idea to start the event was hatched at the local science fiction convention Norwescon in 2008 when multiple people expressed an interest to hold an event devoted exclusively to steampunk. Although the idea for a Seattle area Steampunk convention referred to as SteamCon was first used as the basis for a panel at Anglicon 6 in Seattle in May 1993.

== Past symposia ==
=== 2009 ===
The first Steamcon was held October 23–25, 2009 at the Seattle Airport Marriott in Seatac, Washington. The convention in its first year had 1,350 people attend, making it one of the largest, if not the largest, steampunk devoted conventions in North America.

Guests of Honor

- Author Guest of Honor: Tim Powers
- Artist Guest of Honor: Paul Guinan
- Musical Guests of Honor: Abney Park

=== 2010 ===
The second annual Steamcon was held November 19–21, 2010. The host venues were the Hilton Seattle Airport Hotel and the Seattle Airport Marriott. The theme was "Weird Weird West." Approximately 1,950 guests were in attendance.

Guests of Honor

- Author Guest of Honor: James Blaylock
- Artist Guest of Honor: Jake Von Slatt
- Games Guest of Honor: Shane Hensley

=== 2011 ===
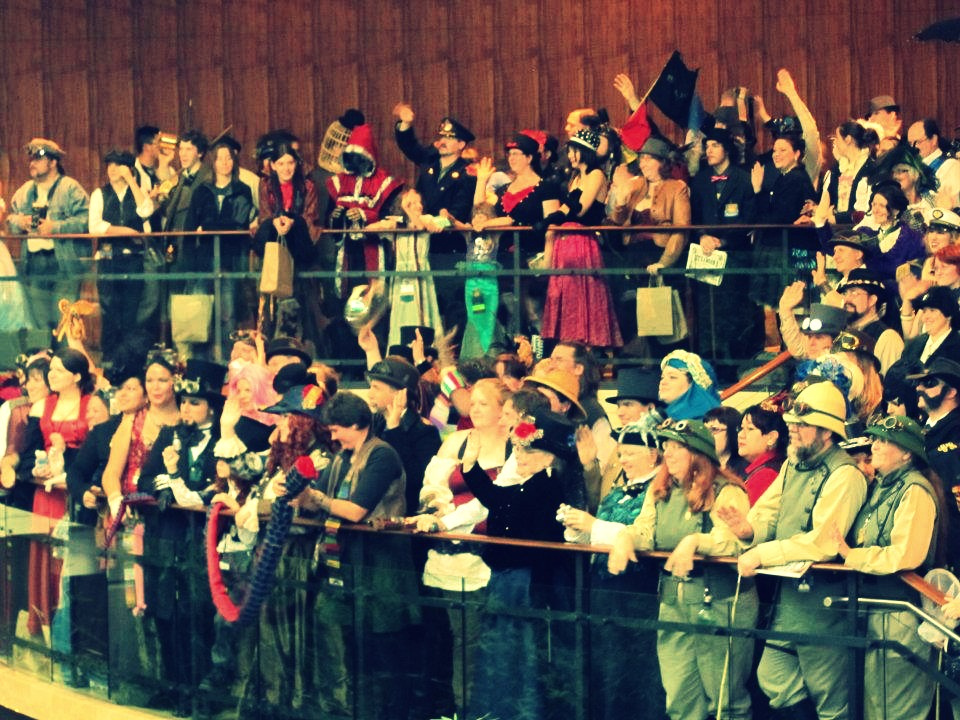
Group at Steamcon III

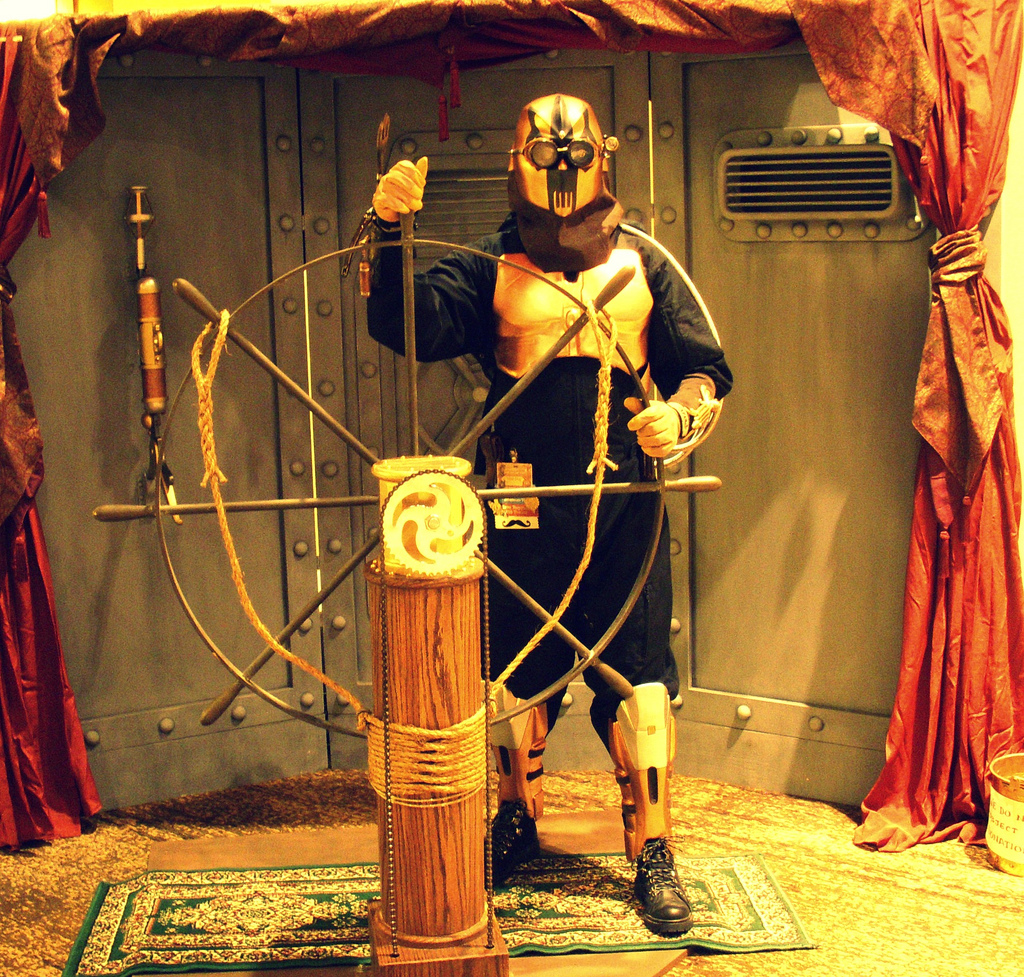
Mad Dog Diver at Steamcon III

The third annual Steamcon was held October 14–16, 2011. The host venue was the Bellevue Hyatt Regency Bellevue. The theme was "20,000 Leagues Under the Sea". About 2,250 guests were in attendance.

Guests of Honor

- Author Guest of Honor: K.W. Jeter
- Artist Guest of Honor: Gary Gianni
- Musical Guests of Honor: Vagabond Opera

=== 2012 ===
The fourth annual Steamcon was held October 26–28, 2012. The host venue was the Bellevue Hyatt Regency. The theme was "Victorian Monsters".

Guests of Honor

- Author Guest of Honor: Kim Newman (unable to attend)
- Artist Guest of Honor: Joe Benitez
- Musical Guests of Honor: Rasputina
- Monster Hunters of Honor: The League of S.T.E.A.M.

=== 2013 ===
The fifth annual Steamcon was held from October 25–27, 2013. The theme was "Around the World". The venue was the Bellevue Hyatt Regency.

Guests of Honor

- Artist Guest of Honor: Brian Kesinger
- Writer Guest of Honor: S. M. Stirling
- Musical Guest of Honor: Professor Elemental

== Cancelled symposium ==
=== 2014 ===
On March 9, 2014, a post on the Steamcon official Facebook page revealed that Steamcon VI would be cancelled due to a debt of at least $41,500 to Bellevue Hyatt Regency and other organizations.

The 6th annual Steamcon was to be held on October 3–5, 2014. The theme was to be "Mechanical World". The venue would have been the Bellevue Hyatt Regency.
