= Super Duper Sumos =

- Title card, featuring (from left-to-right) Kimo, Booma and Mamoo
- Genre: Comedy
- Created by: Kevin O'Donnell
- Voices of: Matt Hill; Ben Hur; Cusse Mankuma; Chantal Strand; Richard Newman; Deborah DeMille
- Composer: Eric Allaman
- Countries of origin: United States; South Korea
- Original languages: English; Korean
- No. of seasons: 1
- No. of episodes: 26

Production
- Executive producers: Andy Heyward; Michael Maliani; Steven SH Yoon
- Producer: Kevin O'Donnell
- Running time: 22 minutes
- Production companies: DIC Entertainment, L.P. Ameko Entertainment

Original release
- Network: Nickelodeon (United States); Tooniverse (South Korea)
- Release: April 7, 2002 – February 2, 2003

Super Duper Sumos (Korean: 으랏차차 삼총사) is an animated series co-produced by DIC Entertainment, L.P. and Ameko Entertainment.

== Overview ==
Three crimefighting sumo wrestlers—brothers Booma, Kimo, and Mamoo—go on adventures and fight crime.

A typical episode consisted of "Bad Inc" trying to destroy Generic City in numerously themed ways, although almost all of their plans involved giant monsters. The head of Bad Inc, Ms. Mister, usually assigned the in-house mad scientist Stinger to create these evil monsters. At the end of each episode, Ms. Mister fires Stinger for failing to create an unstoppable monster (although he always appears employed in the next episode and is never permanently fired). Every episode contained gratuitous use of the word "butt".

In every episode, the three wrestlers use "Sumo Size". This makes them stronger, more muscular, and considerably larger. Each sumo has a characteristic move they use when "Sumo Sized", usually the three sumos initiate their attack one after another in the same order. Often in times of trouble, the sumos undertake a flashback remembering something Wisdom San (their teacher) taught them. They also may get advice from Prima, who is the sumos' friend and encouraging sidekick who often follows them and acts the most sensibly. Throughout the whole series, each sumo fights for their own cause (they draw their abilities from a force known as "P.H.A.T.", standing for Peace, Honor and Truth).

== Characters ==
=== The Super Duper Sumos ===
- Mamoo is an Afro-Caribbean sumo who is their most sensible member and unofficial leader, fighting for Truth. He likes to cook as well as eat and was disheartened after losing a cooking challenge on a show sponsored by Bad Inc, regaining his confidence after realizing that the challenge was (obviously) rigged. His special move is "Sumo Squeeze", where he grabs an opponent from behind and gives them a powerful bear hug.
- Kimo is an Asian sumo who resembles a samurai and has a Zen-like attitude to life, fighting for Honor. He is apparently precognitive, as his younger self foresaw the Sumos' battles against Bad Inc. First evidenced in "Dance of the Sugar Plumb Sumos", he also has a habit of making corny one-liners when claiming victory, much to his own amusement and Mamoo's chagrin. His special move is "Honorable Thunderball", which involves him rolling into a ball and launching himself at an opponent.
- Booma is the Caucasian sumo who talks like a surfer and is the most enthusiastic and child-like, fighting for Peace. He is obsessed with his large butt and proudly talks about it in every episode. His special move is "Gluteus Maximus", involving him landing on an opponent butt-first and squashing them.

=== Allies ===
- Prima is a small, thin girl who acts as the Sumos' friend and helps them out as she can, although their dimwitted and childish ways often annoy her.
- Wisdom San is the Sumos' yogi-like teacher, who raised them from infancy and taught them the ways of P.H.A.T. He is usually seen in flashbacks, but sometimes appears in contemporary sections of the episode. He resembles an Eastern mystic, seems to wear nothing apart from sandals (although this is debatable, as his beard covers most of his body), and is often seen meditating, levitating, or both. He found raising the Sumos frustrating due to their greed and clumsiness.
- Shemo is the Sumos' long-lost sister who was separated from them as a baby when baby Booma accidentally knocked her down Wisdom San's mountain home. She was consequently raised by a herd of yaks (who somehow knew the ways of P.H.A.T.) and grew up to be the superheroic guardian of Kyoto and its yak population. When Bad Inc devastated the city and kidnapped the yaks and the mayor, Shemo traveled to Generic City to get them back. She turned out to be a better fighter than the boys and turned down their help, but they had to rescue her after Bad Inc captured her. The four Sumos defeated Bad Inc together and Shemo, politely refusing the offer to stay with her "brothers", returned to Kyoto.
- The Gyoji is a mute, goofy-looking Gyōji that appears in most episodes whenever the Sumos are about to fight. A running gag is him emerging from a nearby area (such as a mailbox) to observe the battle.

=== Bad Inc ===
- Ms. Mister is the main villain of the series. The cruel CEO of Bad Inc is constantly infuriated by their inability to destroy Generic City and defeat the Sumos, who she often refers to as the "Stupid Dupid Sumos". She orders almost all of the monsters and to be made. She also wears the pendant that summons Genghis Fangus from the dead.
- Billy "BS" Swift: Invariably clad in a black polo neck and sunglasses, he seems to be the administration of Bad Inc. Dr. Stinger seems to view him as a love rival, but BS has no interest in Ms. Mister (apart from trying to make sure their plan actually works so she won't yell at him), whom BS curiously refers to as "Mum" once early on in the show.
- Dr. Stinger is a green-skinned, hunchbacked mad scientist who is employed to create the various giant monsters and robots used in Bad Inc's plans. He is romantically obsessed with Ms. Mister and a bit too childish to be an effective villain. A running gag is Ms. Mister firing him, usually very loudly.
- Genghis Fangus is a ghostly entity summoned from Ms. Mister's pendant that constantly lectures the other villains, insisting that evil was more effective in his day. He tried to conquer the world long ago but was opposed and thwarted by Wisdom San. He claims to have been close friends with Napoleon Bonaparte and Attila the Hun in his youth.
- The Evil Sumos: Originally created to oppose the Super Duper Sumos, they occasionally make reappearances acting as Bad Inc's "muscle". They consist of He of the Extra Arms (counterpart of Mamoo), He of the Big Iron Chest (counterpart of Kimo), and He of the Third Butt Cheek (counterpart of Booma).

== Episode list ==
No.	Title
1	"Binky Did a Bad Bad Thing"
Bad Inc. creates a forty-foot, monstrous Teddy Bear, named Binky, which terrorizes the city.
2	"The Seven Sumorai"
Bad Inc. is making giant buildings in a small fishing town in New Jersey, and the sumos have to stop them.
3	"Basho Crasho Sumos"
The big-bottomed bros fight in a huge sumo tournament, which turns out to be a sinister trap set by Bad Inc.
4	"The Incredible Shrinking Butt"
Booma loses the will to fight after Bad Inc's shrinking formula shrinks his butt.
5	"Dance of the Sugar Plum Sumos"
The Super Duper Sumos must go undercover as ballerinas to thwart Bad Inc.'s evil plan.
6	"Eviction Conviction"
The Bad Inc. building is getting too crowded so they decide to make another one right above the sumos' house.
7	"Beach Blanket Sumos"
The Sumos' day at the beach is ruined by Bad Inc's robot shark.
8	"Handle with Care"
The big-bottomed bros believe that Bad, Inc. has turned Prima into a small, glass figurine.
9	"Rest Area 51"
The Sumos & Bad Inc. take a break and go camping in the woods.
10	"Car Yak'd"
The sumos' yaks are stolen and they don't know what to do without their transportation.
11	"Sumos on Ice"
Bad Inc. blocks out the sun with a giant pie-shaped blimp in order to freeze the planet.
12	"Back to School"
The Sumos go undercover to help a high-school student who is receiving threatening letters.
13	"Phat to the Phuture"
Kimo has a psychic vision/premonition that Booma gets destroyed in a fight with Bad Inc.
14	"Honor Thy Phather"
Genghis tricks Kimo into believing that he is his father.
15	"Sumos on a Hot Tin Roof"
Bad Inc. unleashes a horrendous heat wave upon Generic City full of savage plants and rampaging savages.
16	"No Lie Pie"
Mamoo goes up against Dr. Stinger on a Bad Inc. cooking show.
17	"Pinch Me I'm Steaming"
Dr. Stinger animates his lunch into a giant, killer dumpling, which terrorizes Generic City.
18	"To Serve and Neglect"
Kimo gets promoted to be a higher-ranking sumotori than Booma and Mamoo.
19	"Santa's a Big Fat Sumo"
Dr. Stinger kidnaps Santa Claus and disguises himself as the jolly old fellow.
20	"The Girth of Cool"
BS designs a sleek new monster for Bad Inc. and suddenly evil becomes trendy all over town.
21	"A Clock Work Sumo"
Bad Inc replaces Kimo with a robot.
22	"Mini Golf Madness"
Kimo's love of miniature golf leads to the discovery that Bad Inc. is attempting to control kids' minds.
23	"I'm Too Sexy for My Butt"
Booma gets a job as an underwear model.
24	"Yak Derby"
The big-bottomed bros enter themselves in the annual, world-famous Generic City Derby.
25	"Shemo the Fourth Sumoteer"
The Sumos are reunited with their long-lost sister.
26	"That Was Zen, This is Tao"
Bad Inc invents a time traveling umbrella and tries to wipe the Sumos from existence.

== Voice cast ==
- Matt Hill as Booma
- Ben Hur as Kimo
- Cusse Mankuma as Mamoo
- Chantal Strand as Prima
- Richard Newman as Wisdom San
- Deborah DeMille as Ms. Mister
- Michael Dobson as Genghis Fangus/Billy Swift
- Peter Kelamis as Dr. Stinger

=== Additional voice cast ===
- Kathleen Barr -
- Ian James Corlett -
- Brenda Crichlow -
- Gail Fabrey -
- Jason Michas -
- Brent Miller -
- Shirley Millner -
- Colin Murdock -

== Production ==
In October 1999, DIC Entertainment (then-owned by The Walt Disney Company) teamed up with South Korean firm Ameko Entertainment to produce three animated shows, with Super Duper Sumos being the first as part of the deal. This would be the first time DIC would partner with a Korean company to co-producing an animated series and not just outsource.

The production of the series began in July 2000. DIC handled worldwide distribution for the property except in Korea, where Ameko distributed the series.

== Broadcast ==
The show first aired in the United Kingdom on CBBC on September 22, 2001. Shortly after its UK debut, DIC pre-sold the series to a selection of broadcasters including Antena 3 (Spain), YTV (Canada), Mediaset (Italy), Foxtel (Australia, to air on Fox Kids), Fox Kids (Latin America), Disney Channel (Asia), and RCTV (Venezuela).

The series debuted in the United States on Nickelodeon on April 7, 2002. Reruns of the series aired in syndication in 2005.

Additional pre-sales over the world included Disney Channel in France in 2003.

== Merchandise ==
DIC signed a European deal with the UK-based toy company Martin Yaffe International in October 2001 to develop a toy and merchandising line based on the property, alongside DIC's Consumer Products division handling other kinds of merchandising.

== Home media ==
In 2002, ADV Films acquired the distribution rights to the series on VHS and DVD, and in February 2003, released "They've got Guts!" on VHS and DVD, consisting of the first five episodes of the series. ADV would later release five more volumes throughout that year.

In July 2010, Mill Creek Entertainment released a 10-episode best-of collection entitled Super Duper Sumos: They've Got Guts! on DVD in Region 1, which also includes a bonus episode of World of Quest.

DVD/VHS name	Episodes	Distributor	Release date
They Got GUTS!	"Binky Did a Bad Bad Thing" "The Seven Sumorai" "Basho Crasho Sumos" "The Incredible Shrinking Butt" "Dance of the Sugar Plum Sumos"	ADV Films	February 4, 2003
Absolutely Flabulous	"Eviction Conviction" "Beach Blanket Sumos" "Handle with Care" "Rest Area 51" "Car Yak'd"	ADV Films	March 18, 2003
Deep Sushi	"Sumos on Ice" "Back to School" "Phat to the Future" "Honor Thy Phather"	ADV Films	April 29, 2003
Way of the Phat	"Sumos on a Hot Tin Roof" "No Lie Pie" "Pinch Me I'm Steaming" "To Serve and Neglect"	ADV Films	June 10, 2003
Sumo Squeezo	"Santa's a Big Fat Sumo" "The Girth of Cool" "A Clock Work Sumo" "Mini Golf Madness"	ADV Films	July 22, 2003
Big Bottom Bros	"I'm Too Sexy for My Butt" "Yak Derby" "Shemo the Fourth Sumoteer" "That Was Zen, This is Tao"	ADV Films	September 2, 2003
They've Got GUTS!	"Binky Did a Bad Bad Thing" "The Seven Sumorai" "Basho Crasho Sumos" "The Incredible Shrinking Butt" "Dance of the Sugar Plum Sumos" "Eviction Conviction" "Beach Blanket Sumos" "Handle with Care" "Rest Area 51" "Car Yak'd"; Bonus World of Quest episode	Mill Creek Entertainment	July 27, 2010

== Video game ==
A video game based on the series for the Game Boy Advance was developed by Midway Games and released on October 26, 2003. A PlayStation 2 game was planned but never surfaced.
