= Wraithborn =

- Cover of the first issue

Publication information
- Publisher: WildStorm
- Format: Limited series
- Publication date: November 30, 2006
- No. of issues: 6

Creative team
- Written by: Joe Benitez & Marcia Chen
- Artist(s): Joe Benitez, Joe Weems
- Penciller: Joe Benitez
- Inker: Joe Weems
- Colorist(s): Studio F & Tony Avina

Wraithborn is an American comic book limited series by Joe Benitez and Marcia Chen, launched in November 2005. It is his largest body of work after his time as regular penciler on Top Cow's The Darkness.

Wraithborn was published by WildStorm under its WildStorm Signature imprint, which replaced the Cliffhanger imprint.

== Story ==
The Wraithborn power is normally given to a specially chosen warrior, someone who has trained for decades to wield the power and fight the Immortals. Due to "unforeseen circumstances", the power is passed on to an ordinary high school girl who doesn't know anything about what's going on, but she's got to figure things out fast because a lot of "people" (including the Immortals) are coming after her.

At the heart of things, Wraithborn is about the transformation of a sweet, timid, innocent girl into a tough, badass, seemingly cold and heartless warrior who has to do a lot of things that she may not like to do. She goes on her journey, through the many trials she has to face, the mistakes she'll make, and the grievous consequences of those mistakes. In addition, it's also about the journey made by Valin, the male lead of the story, who is the young man who was supposed to be given the Wraithborn power.

== Concept ==
The book is a supernatural, dark fantasy story inspired by folklore and mythologies from around the world. The idea is that all these legends were based on some truth, that gods and demons and angels and so forth really do exist, and they once walked this earth. One day, they all seemed to vanish, and eventually they are written as fiction. Despite it, they're still around, and they're trying to get back and reclaim their former "lordship and dominion" over all humankind.

The Wraithborn are special individuals who have the only power that can fight these "Immortals", and throughout the ages, they've been protecting the Earth and preventing the Immortals from returning.

== Issues ==
Issue #1: The story starts out with the tough and fearless Wraithborn. Seemingly, the Immortals are powerless unless someone "invites them in" and when that happens, she has to deal with the consequences (the Immortals take possession of the mortal's body). Wraithborn seems to have a terrible past; the story alludes the total loss of her family and friends as a result of some foolish mistake.

The story switches to Melanie Moore - an ordinary teenage girl cooking breakfast for her dad. It's apparent that Melanie's starved for fatherly attention and affection. At school she's not that great at sports and the other girls are hard on her. She has a conscious for helping out other people and is described as sweet and caring, nerdy and likable. As the story progresses, it starts to become clear why she is the way she is and the plot begins to unravel as to why Melanie became Wraithborn.

Issue #2: The hunt begins when rival parties, both mortal and Immortal, race to find and capture the new Wraithborn. Meanwhile, Melanie continues her everyday routine, oblivious to both her new powers and "popularity".

Issue #3: The hounds of Brijit have found Melanie but she doesn't know that she has powers. A mysterious stranger shows up, as friend or foe.

Issue #4: Melanie begins to realize she's involved in something she doesn't understand - something dangerous - and she needs help. Meanwhile, Brijit and Kiara each plot their next moves in the race to obtain the power of the Wraithborn.

Issue #5: Secrets are revealed as Melanie continues her quest to understand the Wraithborn and what role she plays with them. Despite all the hidden agendas and challenges she must face, one thing appears certain: she is in constant danger as long as she wields the Wraithborn power.

Issue #6: Melanie is captured by Brijit and is having the Wraithborn power taken from her and she must fight or die against Brijit.
