= The World of Quest =

Comic series by Jason T. Kruse

The World of Quest is a short-lived comic series by Jason T. Kruse shown on the Komikwerks site as a webcomic and later released as a full-graphic novel. The final chapter on the site is called "Prison Break". There are recently two volumes of The World of Quest available from Yen Press. The second volume, The World of Quest: Volume 2 was nominated for two Harvey Awards in 2009 - Best Graphic Album and Best Artist for artist and author Jason Kruse.

The comic was adapted into a Canadian-produced, animated television series titled World of Quest on Kids' WB!; it premiered on March 15, 2008 in the U.S., and The CW dropped the show after the first season completed on June 14 of the same year.
