= The Anubis Tapestry =

Fantasy novel written and illustrated by Bruce Zick

- Cover of the first edition of The Anubis Tapestry: Between Twilights
- Author: Bruce Zick
- Illustrator: Bruce Zick
- Language: English
- Series: The Anubis Tapestry
- Genre: Fantasy
- Publisher: Actionopolis, Komikwerks
- Publication date: 2006
- Publication place: United States
- Media type: Print (hardcover, paperback)
- Pages: 152
- ISBN: 978-0974280387

The Anubis Tapestry: Between Twilights is a 2006 fantasy novel written and illustrated by Bruce Zick.

== Plot summary ==
Chance Henry's archaeologist father accidentally awakens an evil mummy who steals his soul. Chance risks becoming a mummy himself to rescue his father from the Egyptian Underworld.

== Cancelled film adaptation ==
In 2008, Blue Sky Studios acquired the film rights for an animated film titled Anubis. David H. Steinberg wrote the first draft for the film. The film was formerly scheduled for release on July 15, 2016, by 20th Century Fox, but was delayed to March 23, 2018, but in June 2017, it had been pulled from its schedule for unknown reasons. Blue Sky closed on April 10, 2021, ending development on the film.
