= John Gooders =

British writer

- Born: 10 January 1937
- Died: 18 May 2010 (aged 73)
- Occupations: Author; Ornithologist

John Gooders (10 January 1937 – 18 May 2010) was a British writer. He was known for the book Where to Watch Birds. At the time he was a teacher, and a lecturer at Avery Hill College.

== Career in television ==
In 1970, after taking two months off on the Churchill Fellowship in which he studied bird migration through North Africa, he launched his own magazine called The World of Birds. He then finished up working for Anglia Television's Survival series, and edited the company's house magazine The World of Survival.

He appeared in the 1975 BBC programme In Deepest Britain, with Richard Mabey and other naturalists, giving an unscripted narration of the wildlife observed during a country walk.

== Later life ==
John then devoted himself to full-time writing about birds and natural history, also forming a nature tour company. He chaired the Friends of Rye Harbour Nature Reserve for a decade and served on the management committee of the Reserve. He also became the mayor of Winchelsea. He died in May 2010. The John Gooders memorial Hide at Rye Harbour was opened on 21 October 2013 in the presence of Robbie, his wife, and other members of the family.

== Bibliography ==
- —— (1967). Where to Watch Birds.
- —— (1970). Where to watch birds in Britain and Europe.
- —— (1970). Birds of the world.
- —— (1972). The How and Why Wonder Book of The Spoilt Earth.
- —— (1973). The How and Why Wonder Book of Birds.
- —— (1974). The Bird Watcher's Book.
- —— (1975). Birds. An Illustrated Survey of the Bird Families of The World.
- —— (1975). The Great Book Of Birds.
- —— (1975). How to Watch Birds.
- —— (1975). Wildlife Paradises. A Worldwide Guide.
- —— (1975). The Second Bird-watcher's Book.
- —— (1976). The Third Bird-watcher's Book.
- —— (1977). Where to Watch Birds (p/b).
- —— (1977). The Great Book of Birds.
- —— (1978). Birds of Mountain and Moorland.
- —— (1978). Birds of Ocean and Estuary.
- —— (1979). The Illustrated Encyclopedia of Birds.
- —— (1979). Birds of Heath and Woodland.
- —— (1979). Birds of Hedgerow and Garden.
- —— (1979). Birds of Marsh and Shore.
- —— (1979). A Day in the Country.
- —— (1980). Bird Seeker's Guide.
- —— (1981). The Encyclopedia of Birds (London: Orbis Publishing, 91 parts).
- —— (1981). Finding Birds Around the World.
- —— (1982). Collins British Birds.
- —— (1983). Birds That Came Back.
- —— (1984). Birds of Canada.
- —— (1986). Ducks of North America and the Northern Hemisphere.
- —— (1986). Ducks of Canada and the Northern Hemisphere.
- —— (1986). Ducks of Britain & the Northern Hemisphere.
- —— (1986). The New Where to Watch Birds.
- —— (1987). Birds of North America.
- —— (1988). Where to watch birds in Britain and Europe.
- —— (1989). The Outdoor Guide to Britain.
- —— (1989). Complete Birdwatcher's Guide.
- —— (1990). The Practical Ornithologist.
- —— (1992). The Birdwatchers Site Guide to Britain & Ireland.
- —— (1993). The Survival World of Birds.
- —— (1998). Collins Guide to Birds.
- —— (1998). Birds of Britain & Europe.
- —— (2000). Birds of the British Isles & Europe.
- —— (2001). Birds of Britain & Europe.
