= Shannon Denton =

American artist and storyteller

- Denton in 2026
- Born: Shannon Eric Denton Texas, U.S.
- Areas: Writer, artist, editor, producer
- Notable works: Graveslinger, Grunts, Spectrum, Kingdom Riders
- Awards: Shel Dorf Editor of the Year Award (2011)

Shannon Eric Denton is an American artist, writer, editor, producer, and storyteller born in Texas. He has worked in comics, animation, television, film, video games, and toy design for companies including Cartoon Network, Warner Bros., Marvel Entertainment, DC Comics, Disney, Riot Games, LEGO, Paramount, Nickelodeon, and Sony.

In 2011 he won the Shel Dorf Editor of the Year Award. His work on comic books and animation, both as artist and writer, was described in Gemstone Publishing's The Scoop as having made "an indelible mark upon the comics industry".

He was described in Keyframe as an "animation industry veteran". He worked on the animated series X-Men: The Animated Series, Spider-Man Unlimited, and Silver Surfer. Denton was EIC of Lion Forge Comics.

Denton began his comics career in the early 1990s working for Image Comics' Extreme Studios with Deadpool creator Rob Liefeld. During the mid-1990s he contributed to the development and design of numerous action-adventure animated series for Fox Kids, including X-Men, Spider-Man, and Silver Surfer.

Denton was a storyboard artist on the Academy Award-nominated animated feature Jimmy Neutron: Boy Genius and directed promotional animation for the film. His animation and television credits include work on Teen Titans, Justice League Action, Danny Phantom, Ben 10, Transformers: Robots in Disguise, Avengers Assemble, Spider-Man, The Simpsons, Scooby-Doo, Robot Chicken, Stillwater, and Community.

He wrote on Grunts, which was published by Arcana Studios. Graveslinger, an undead story set in Arizona Territory in 1873, was written with Jeff Mariotte. Fleshdigger, another zombie comic made with Brad Keene, was an entrant in Top Cow's Pilot Season. He is co-creator of the Con Man spin-off comic Spectrum.

In 2000, Denton co-founded the independent publishing company Komikwerks with Patrick Coyle. The company later partnered with Stan Lee and AOL on digital comics initiatives and launched the children's imprint Actionopolis.

In 2020, Denton formed Monster Forge Productions with Steve Niles. Monster Forge produces content for gaming, movies and television in the horror genre.

In 2024, Denton and artist Marcus To published their graphic novel Kingdom Riders.

== Awards and recognition ==
In 2025, the American Library Association selected Kingdom Riders, published by IDW Publishing through Monster Forge Productions, for its "Best Graphic Novels for Children" list.

Denton contributed to award-winning promotional campaigns for the video game Valorant at Riot Games. In 2024, Valorant: Console Announce Gameplay Trailer received a Bronze award at the Clio Awards for Audio Visual Craft: Editing. Valorant: Console Launch Trailer received a Bronze honor at the Ciclope Festival, while Valorant: Console Announce Welcome Trailer received Silver and Bronze honors at the Clio Awards.

In 2023, Monster Forge Productions and Printed In Blood received a nomination from the Rondo Hatton Classic Horror Awards for the Bernie Wrightson Tribute Art Book.

Denton contributed to the Apple TV+ animated series Stillwater, which received both a Peabody Award and an Emmy Award in 2021.

In 2020, The Rocketeer received five Emmy Award nominations and Denton was on the development team for the show.

Denton was part of the production team for Robot Chicken, which won the Primetime Emmy Award for Outstanding Short Form Animated Program at the 70th Primetime Emmy Awards in 2018.

In 2017, the comic series Spectrum, associated with Con Man, won the Mike Wieringo Comic Book Industry Award (Ringo Award) for Fan Favorite Best Series.

Denton was a writer on the Eisner Award-nominated anthology Outlaw Territory, published by Image Comics.

In 2014, Denton participated in the creation of Down In Robotown, which received recognition from Guinness World Records for breaking the record for the fastest comic book written, illustrated, and published.

In 2011, Denton became the first graphic novelist selected for the National Park Service Artist-in-Residence program at Petrified Forest National Park.

His graphic novel Grunts: War Stories received a nomination for the 29th Annual Comic Buyers Guide Fan Awards for Favorite Graphic Novel. Denton also received multiple Comic Buyers Guide Award nominations in the Favorite Editor category between 2009 and 2011.

His comic series Graveslinger received a Harvey Award nomination in 2010.

Denton served as a storyboard artist on the Academy Award-nominated animated feature Jimmy Neutron: Boy Genius, which was nominated for Best Animated Feature at the 74th Academy Awards.

In 2001, Denton received the Comic Shop News Readers Choice "Red Kryptonite" Award for Favorite New Creator.

== Bibliography ==
=== Comics ===
==== Writer ====
- Airwolf: Airstrikes (Lion Forge Comics, 2015)
- Ash and the Army of Darkness (Dynamite Entertainment, 2013)
- Big Game (Image Comics, 1999)
- Brother Bedlam (2006)
- Common Foe (with co-author Keith Giffen and art by Jean-Jacques Dzialowski, Desperado Publishing, 2005–2006, tpb, 168 pages, December 2007, ISBN 0-9795939-6-4)
- Country Ass-Whuppin': A Tornado Relief Anthology (2012)
- DC Holiday Special '09 (DC Comics, 2010)
- Doc Savage (Dynamite Entertainment, 2013)
- DoubleFeature: Action (2011)
- Graveslinger (with co-author Jeff Mariotte and art by John Cboins and Nima Sorat, 4-issue mini-series, Image Comics, October 2007 – 2008)
- Grunts (with co-author Keith Giffen and art by Matt Jacobs, Arcana Studios, 2006)
- Gutwrencher (with co-authors Keith Giffen and Steve Niles and art by Anthony Hightower, 3-issue mini-series, Shadowline, 2008)
- Heavy Metal (Heavy Metal)
- Knight Rider (Lion Forge Comics, 2013)
- Knight Rider: Knight Strikes (Lion Forge Comics, 2015)
- Komikwerks (2003)
- Komikwerks Presents: Nuts and Bolts (2004)
- Komikwerks Presents: Rockets & Robots (2005)
- Komikwerks Presents: Thrills & Chills (2005)
- Lady Rawhide/Lady Zorro (Dynamite Entertainment, 2015)
- The Lone Ranger (Dynamite Entertainment, 2012)
- "Aces" (with co-author G. Willow Wilson and art by Curtis Square-Briggs, in Negative Burn #7–10, Desperado Publishing, 2006–2007)
- Ninja High School (Antarctic Press)
- Notti & Nyce (2013)
- Outlaw Territory (Image Comics, 2009)
- Pilot Season: Fleshdigger (Top Cow Productions, 2011)
- The Revenant (2009)
- Shannon Denton's Actionopolis (2001)
- The Spider (Dynamite Entertainment, 2012)
- Tabula Rasa (2006)
- Tales from a Forgotten Planet (2006)
- Vampirella (Dynamite Entertainment, 2010)
- Vampirella Halloween Special 2013 (Dynamite Entertainment, 2013)
- The X-Files Annual (2014)
- Zapt! (2006)
- Kingdom Riders (with Marcus To). IDW. ISBN 978-1-68405-978-2

==== Penciller ====
- The All New Exiles (1995)
- Big Bang Comics (1996)
- Big Game (1999)
- Deadpool #8–10, 12 (with writer Joe Kelly, other pencils by Ed McGuinness and inks by Norman Lee and Nathan Massengill, Marvel Comics, 1997–1998)
- Fantastic Four: World's Greatest Comics Magazine (2001)
- Hero Squared (2005)
- Komikwerks (2003)
- Komikwerks Presents: Nuts and Bolts (2004)
- Komikwerks Presents: Thrills & Chills (2005)
- Marvel Heroes (2010)
- Marvel Mega (1997)
- The Mystery of the Roanoke Colony (2007)
- Outlaw Territory (2009)
- Prophet (1995)
- The Sakai Project: Artists Celebrate Thirty Years of Usagi Yojimbo (2014)
- Scratch9 (2010)
- Scratch9: Cat Tails (2013)
- Shannon Denton's Actionopolis (2001)
- Spawn (1992)
- Supreme #24 (pencils, with writer Gary Carlson, other pencils by Cedric Nocon and inks by Norm Rapmund, Image Comics, 1995)
- Violator (1999)

==== Editor ====
- Airwolf: Airstrikes (2015)
- Andre the Giant: Closer to Heaven (2015)
- The Authority (2008)
- The Authority: Prime (2007)
- Chavo Guerrero's Warrior's Creed (2016)
- Chuck (2008)
- Free Realms (2009)
- Garrison (2010)
- Gears of War (2008)
- Gen13 (2006)
- Ides of Blood (2010)
- Knight Rider (2013)
- Knight Rider: Knight Strikes (2015)
- Miami Vice Remix (2015)
- Night Trap (2013, 2016)
- Prototype (2009)
- Rampage Jackson: Street Soldier (2015)
- Resident Evil (2009)
- Spectrum (2016)
- Stormwatch: P.H.D. (2007)
- Tom Strong and the Robots of Doom (2010)
- Wetworks: Mutations (2010)
- WildCats (2008)
- Wolf Moon (2014)
- The X-Files (2008)
- The X-Files/30 Days of Night (2010)

=== Animation and television ===
==== Writer ====
- Hi Hi Puffy AmiYumi (2006)
- World of Quest (2008–2009)
- Justice League Action (2017)
- Ben 10 (2017)
- Transformers: Robots in Disguise (2017)
- Avengers Assemble (2017)
- Spider-Man (2019)

==== Storyboard artist / animation ====
- X-Men: The Animated Series
- Teenage Mutant Ninja Turtles
- Jimmy Neutron: Boy Genius
- Danny Phantom
- Teen Titans
- Silver Surfer
- Justice League
- Avengers Assemble
- Spider-Man Unlimited
- Ally McBeal
- Las Vegas
- Con Man
- United States of Tara
- Dan Dare
- He-Man and the Masters of the Universe
- G.I. Joe
- Community
- Stillwater
- Samurai Rabbit: The Usagi Chronicles
- The Simpsons
- Crossing Swords
- Army of the Dead
- Batman
- Scooby-Doo
- Corn & Peg
- The Life and Times of Juniper Lee

=== Video games ===
- Final Fantasy VII
- League of Legends
- League of Legends: Wild Rift
- Legends of Runeterra
- Valorant
- God of War
- Kingdoms of Amalur: Reckoning
- Neopets
- Overwatch
- Diablo
- Hearthstone
- Warcraft
- StarCraft

=== Toy industry ===
- Hasbro
- LEGO
- Marvel Entertainment
