= Joe Benitez =

American comic book artist

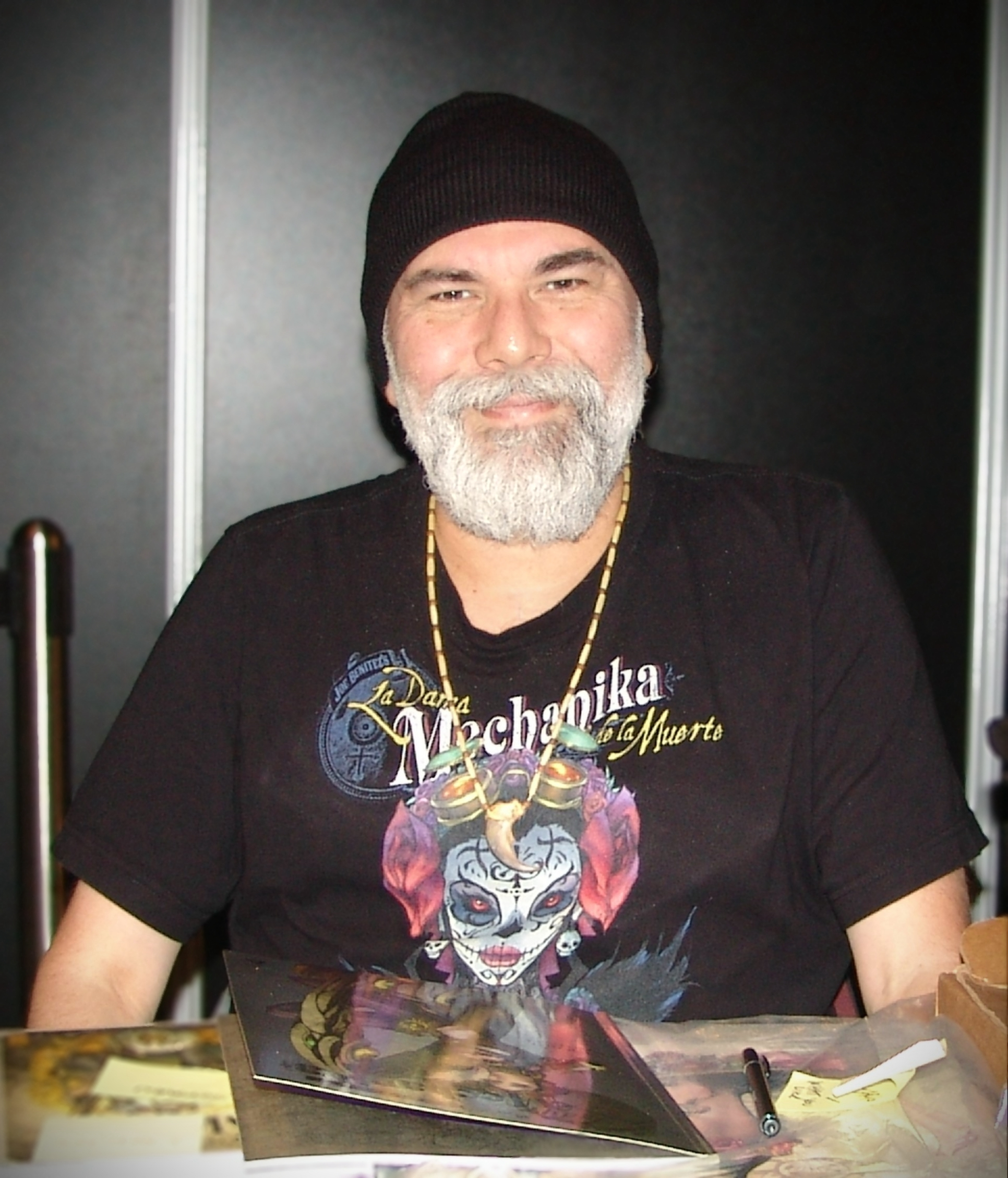
- Benitez on Belgian convention FACTS in 2023
- Born: May 21, 1971 (age 54)
- Occupation: Comic book artist

Joe Benitez (born May 21, 1971) is an American comic book artist. He is co-creator and penciller of Weapon Zero, published by Top Cow Productions as well as Lady Mechanika.

Other titles he has worked on include The Darkness, The Magdalena, as well as work for DC Comics.

== Bibliography ==
- Cyberforce Origins: Cyblade
- Weapon Zero (Top Cow Productions)
- The Darkness (Top Cow Productions)
- The Magdalena (Top Cow Productions):
  - Blood Divine (with Marcia Chen, 3-issue mini-series)
  - Magdalena/Vampirella #1 (with David Wohl)
- Ballistic/Wolverine (Marvel/Top Cow Crossover)
- Witchblade/Elektra (Marvel/Top Cow Crossover)
- Silver Surfer/Weapon Zero (Marvel/Top Cow Crossover)
- Supergirl #11 (DC Comics)
- Wraithborn (with Marcia Chen, 6-issue mini-series, Wildstorm, 2005-2006)
- Detective Comics #823 (DC Comics, 2006)
- Titans vol. 2: #2-4
- Soulfire #9-10
- Lady Mechanika vol. 1: #0-3 (Aspen MLT, 2010–12)
- Lady Mechanika vol. 1: #4-5 (Benitez Productions, 2015)
- Lady Mechanika: The Tablet of Destinies, vol. 2, #1-6 (Benitez Productions, 2015)
- Lady Mechanika: The Lost Boys of West Abbey, #1-2 (Benitez Productions, 2016)
- Wraithborn: Redux (with Marcia Chen), #1-6 (Benitez Productions, 2016)
- Lady Mechanika: La Dama de la Muerte, #1-3 (Benitez Productions, 2016)
- Lady Mechanika: Clockwork Assassin, #1-3 (Benitez Productions, 2017)
