= Weapon Zero =

Series publication information
- Schedule: Monthly
- Format: Ongoing series
- Genre: Science fiction
- Number of issues: 20
- Creator(s): Joe Benitez Marc Silvestri

Weapon Zero

Group publication information
- First appearance: Weapon Zero #1 (June 1995)
- Created by: Joe Benitez Marc Silvestri

In-story information
- Base(s): Tartarus
- Leader(s): Ordnance

Roster

Cover of the first issue

Weapon Zero is a science fiction/superhero comic book series created by Joe Benitez and Marc Silvestri. It was published by Top Cow Productions in the 1990s. The production changed hands after issue #4.

== Publication history ==
Weapon Zero launched in June 1995 with a five issue mini-series prologue. This prologue deviated from traditional numbering of each comic in that it started with #T-4(T minus 4) and counted down to #0.

It was followed up in March 1996 with an ongoing series that lasted 15 issues.

== Plot ==
=== Prologue ===
Three astronauts are sent to investigate strange energy readings received from the moon's dark side. They discover a hidden base of aliens called the T'srri. Unrah and Juarez are killed, and while Col. Tyson Stone escaped, he is infected with T'srri bio-tech, namely a master logic module. When he returns home, his wife Lorelei reveals herself as a Batai, an alien race who had been at war with the T'srri. She cleanses Stone of the T'srri mindworm that was starting to take over him.

Meanwhile, the T'srri on the base begin to awaken from cold sleep. These are actually humans who had been abducted over a period of 2000 years. They are now being converted by the bio-tech to serve as T'srri. Three children and a dog escape this process: Kikuyo, Jamie, Valaria and Janus are physically altered and gain unique powers, but retain their identities. Back on Earth, Lorelei explains to Stone a little of the war and that new warriors were being sought to fight the T'srri. They are interrupted by N'golth, the T'srri commander of the moonbase, who has come to reclaim the master logic module as he needs this in order to summon the main T'srri force through a dimensional gate. Lorelei faces N'golth and is killed.

N'golth then takes Stone back to the base, and attempts to extract the module from his brain. However Stone escapes using Lorelei's battle-staff, which merges with him to become a symbiotic armour. He teleports to Earth taking the kids with him. N'golth makes preparations to create a new module from scanned data, and also has Lorelei reanimated as a T'srri. Lorelei tracks Stone through the energy signature of the teleport, and attempts to capture him and the kids. However they escape, and this time hide their signal from her. They locate the crash site of two warships which had collided and fallen to Earth, and obtain an anti-matter device on board. They return with this hoping to destroy the T'srri base, but are recaptured and Lorelei reclaims her armour from Stone. By this time, recreation of the module is complete, and N'golth uses it to summon the T'srri Seneschal to Earth. He shows off Lorelei to the Seneschal and explains his intention to fully convert Stone and the children into T'srri as a unit, with Lorelei placed as commander. He names this unit Weapon Zero.

Meanwhile, Janus shape-shifts out of his restraints and releases the others, and Stone finds that he can regenerate another version of his lost Batai armour. Weapon Zero attacks and damages the gate before the waiting T'srri can come through. To prevent his failure being reported, N'golth attempts to kill the Seneschal, who escapes back through the gate. N'golth is unconcerned, as he is sure the damaged gate will scatter the Seneschal into atoms. Meanwhile, Stone faces Lorelei, and activates the anti-matter device still in her armour. Weapon Zero teleports away as the base explodes.

=== Arsenal Of Democracy ===
Stone brings the kids to his home, but it explodes due to a Batai security measure left by Lorelei. Finding that none of Stone's friends and neighbours know who he is, they camp outside for the night and in the morning meet an army squad led by Major Arbuckle, who have been sent to investigate after the explosion at the site of Stone's mission to the moon. They are interrupted and captured by a covert organisation calling themselves the Arsenal Of Democracy, who have arrived for the same reason. They bring Weapon Zero to a secret facility beneath the Potomac river and brainwash Stone into working for them. When Weapon Zero break free, he is sent against them. However, Stone has been feigning his indoctrination in order to buy his team-mates time to regroup. They rescue Arbuckle, who sets off a locator beacon for his squad to find them. They escape the base, surface on the river and are rescued by helicopters. When the army later returns to investigate the Potomac, they find no sign the base had ever been there.

=== Japan ===
Weapon Zero travel to the Kofuku clan territory, Kikuyo's family, in hopes of finding treasure with which they can support themselves. On arrival, they find the grounds of Kofuku castle have been taken over by the Yakuza. After a brief confrontation, they flee, and Kikuyo leads them through a secret tunnel. They head to the hills behind the castle, to a cemetery where Kikuyo locates a hidden compartment within a false grave. Instead of treasure they find Kofuku family heirloom, a samurai's ancient armour. After they camp for the night, Kikuyo slips off alone to think. She meets an old woman and several more Yakuza, and learns that many of the Yakuza here are descended from the Kofuku clan. Kikuyo introduces Weapon Zero as her new family, and they depart on good terms. Before she leaves, Kikuyo lets her clan know where to find the Kofuku heirloom. The grateful clan present Weapon Zero with a Swiss bank account.

=== Ansh'r ===
Weapon Zero are attacked by Lorelei's father Ansh'r, apparently in a bid for revenge for his daughter's death. However he turns out to be testing Stone's combat capability, as well as testing his reactions to determine whether he was compromised by the T'srri tech. Having satisfied himself of Stone's integrity, he teleports Weapon Zero to his ship, The Regulus. There, he secretly runs a similar test on the children while he explains to Stone the events of the Batai/T'srri war. With this done, he introduces them to Lorelei's twin sister, Lilith. He then informs them all of the threat posed to Earth by a Berserker, an incredibly powerful T'srri foe which crash landed in Roswell in 1947. It was transported to a secret facility, Area X, and has now awoken. He also explains no-one can remember Stone because all traces of Lorelei, and the associated memories, have been removed from time. Weapon Zero teleport to the facility to face the Berserker.

=== Devil's Reign ===
In the Marvel Universe, the demon Mephisto discovers a crashed T'srri warship and uses it to create a dimensional rift into the Top Cow Universe. He observes Weapon Zero battling the Berserker and surreptitiously starts feeding power into it, causing it to become ever larger and more powerful. Faced with a now unbeatable foe, Ansh'r makes the choice to teleport the Berserker and himself into space. Lilith is now left to guide the team, and she teleports them back to The Regulus. At this point, Jamie, who had never integrated well with his team-mates, abandons them by leaping out of the teleport field and ends up in Los Angeles.

Mephisto meets and allies himself with N'golth and his aide Erisha. Erisha poses as human and takes the name Trisha in order to introduce herself to Jamie and use him for their purposes. She pushes Jamie's anti authoritarian tendencies in order that he would start gathering like-minded youths for Mephisto.

Weapon Zero arrive in LA looking for Jamie, but when they try to link to The Regulus' computer to aid them, they find the ship has disappeared. Lilith then transports them to Lorelei's secret base, Tartarus, within the Sangre de Cristo mountains, where they renew their search.

They locate Jamie at a shrine constructed by Mephisto in the California desert, where he is posing as Jesus Christ calling out for everyone present to pledge their souls to him. When he spots Weapon Zero he strengthens his argument by using his powers to activate their battle forms, exposing them as 'demons'. However his hold on the people is broken when he himself is exposed by the Silver Surfer, who arrives via the rift. The Surfer joins the fight with Weapon Zero against Mephisto's hordes until he is ultimately defeated by Heatwave. Meanwhile, Jamie and Erisha slip away.

=== Gen-13 ===
During the continuing search for Jamie, Valaria gets separated from the group and is befriended by Gen-13, who help her defend against the T'srri when they try to reclaim her.

=== The Amalgaman ===
While Erisha delivers Jamie into N'golth's hands, Weapon Zero detect a T'srri presence on the moonbase. They start exploring the relatively undamaged sections of the base, and encounter The Amalgaman, a formidable T'srri combat team. The resulting battle proves to be one-sided, with The Amalgaman easily overpowering Weapon Zero, and soon Stone alone is left standing. At this point N'golth, Erisha and the now T'srri-converted Jamie arrive at the base. N'golth withdraws The Amalgaman, and sets Jamie on Stone instead. However Stone manages to turn the situation by pointing out that N'golth betrayed the T'srri Seneschal, prompting Jamie and The Amalgaman to turn on him. N'golth succeeds in killing The Amalgaman members individually but Jamie surprises him from behind. Jamie in turn is knocked out by Stone. Lilith purges the Mindworm from his body, and he returns to Weapon Zero.

=== Finale ===
Ansh'r returns to warn Weapon Zero of an imminent invasion by the T'srri. He is joined by several of his Batai comrades, who join forces with the American military against the T'srri in a battle in the skies of Denver. N'golth hijacks a T'srri fighter and rams into the Seneschal's cruiser, sending both ships crashing into the city. Lilith, Ansh'r, and N'golth are killed in battle, while Stone and Kikuyo are critically injured. Outnumbered and soon to be overwhelmed, the battle ends when Jamie creates an explosion that wipes out the T'srri ground forces.

== Characters ==
=== Weapon Zero ===
The team known as Weapon Zero is composed of Stone, Jamie, Kikuyo, Valaria, and Janus. Although they were all given code names by Ansh'r, they generally referred to each other by their original names. They are all failed T'srri conversions in that they have been implanted with the T'srri biotech, but retained their identities having not been taken over by a T'srri mindworm. These T'srri implants provide enough internal energy to power a small city, from which they have all gained unique powers. Abilities they have in common are their symbiotic armour and a lack of physical aging. They are also gifted with innate multilingualism.

==== Colonel Tyson Stone (Ordnance) ====
The de facto leader of Weapon Zero, and also effectively a father figure to his much younger charges.

Stone's T'srri implants were restructured by Lorelei to provide power to the Batai technology in his armour. He can produce any weaponry he wishes from this armour as well as teleport himself and others from one location to another.

==== Jamie Tarleton (Fist) ====
Jamie was abducted by the T'srri while fleeing the press gang in England, though there is some conflict within the story about which city. He is initially established as being from Liverpool, but later referred to as coming from London.

Jamie is a very reluctant member of Weapon Zero, and he runs away after a near-disastrous battle with the Berserker. He falls under the influence of a T'srri mindworm, until he is cleansed by Lilith and rejoins Weapon Zero. He later sacrifices himself to destroy T'srri forces attacking Earth.

Jamie is able to focus energy into his hands and release it in a directed explosion. Although he mainly uses his fingers and hands, he has been shown on one occasion to use his foot.

==== Kikuyo (Slice) ====
Kikuyo is a clan princess from 16th-century Japan who was abducted while on her way to be married into another clan. Her disappearance sparked a war between the two families.

Slice is able to produce sharp claws from the ends of her fingers. She has been shown to elongate her arms for a better reach with her hands. She also appears to have increased strength, as remarked on by one of her combatants. In addition, she has been taught by her father in martial arts.

==== Valaria (Leviathan) ====
Valaria is a Roman girl from Pompeii. The T'srri took her during the eruption of Mount Vesuvius.

Valaria is able to transform into a large and powerful beast at will. This form bears a superficial resemblance to a T'srri Berserker and was referred to as such by a T'srri combatant.

==== Janus ====
Valaria's pet dog from Pompeii, he was taken by the T'ssri when they took her.

Janus gained the ability to speak from his T'srri augmentation. He is also able to change his body structure, including the ability to retract and grow his limbs at will.

=== Other characters ===
- N'golth: The primary antagonist within Weapon Zero. He is commander of the T'srri moonbase until its destruction, and makes several recurring appearances until he is killed by Stone in the final issue.
- Lorelei: Stone's Batai wife, who is killed by N'golth and reanimated as a T'srri.
- Major Jeremiah Arbuckle: Stone's army tutor and old friend. He is kidnapped by the Arsenal of Democracy along with Weapon Zero, and is instrumental to their escape. On parting he lends Stone his credit card, which he later cancels when his memory of them is erased, believing it stolen, though his memory is later restored. He reappears in the finale, apparently now working for or with the AOD.
- Red: Stone's friend and neighbour. When first encountered, he has no memory of Stone sends him away at gunpoint. He later learns of the threat posed by the T'srri and is able to provide information, from his time in covert ops, relevant to locating the T'srri Berserker. Ansh'r then restores his memory.
- Jeffo: Red's son. He is apparently mentally handicapped, and constantly expresses himself using Star Trek analogies.
- Ansh'r: Lorelei's father who travels to Earth to aid Weapon Zero in their fight against the T'srri. He apparently sacrifices himself to defeat the Berserker, but returns at the finale where he is killed in battle.
- Lilith: Lorelei's twin sister, who joins Weapon Zero partway through the series. She is initially very dismissive of Weapon Zero's fortitude, and resents them for the death of her sister and her father, to the extent that she actively attempts to kill them by letting them set off Tartarus' internal defences. She is persuaded not to squander her sister's legacy, and ultimately warms to the group. She is killed in the final battle.
