= Tiffany Vise =

American pair skater

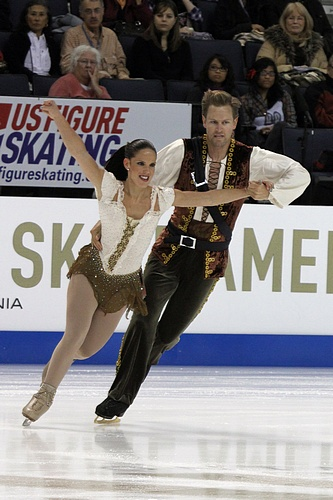
- Vise / Baldwin in 2011.

Personal information
- Full name: Tiffany Vise
- Born: February 2, 1986 (age 40) Aurora, Colorado
- Home town: Colorado Springs, Colorado
- Height: 5 ft 0 in (1.52 m)

Figure skating career
- Country: United States
- Partner: Don Baldwin
- Skating club: Broadmoor SC
- Retired: April 2013

Tiffany Vise (born February 2, 1986) is an American retired pair skater. Between 2003 and 2009, she competed with partner Derek Trent. On November 17, 2007, Vise and Trent landed the first clean throw quadruple salchow jump in international competition. They officially became the first team to perform that element in international competition.

Their partnership ended in the spring of 2009 when Trent retired from competitive skating. Vise teamed up with Don Baldwin and began competing with him in the 2009–2010 season.

Vise is a clockwise spinner while her partners have been counter-clockwise spinners. They were therefore mirror pair teams.

== Personal life ==
Vise was born in Aurora, Colorado. Her younger sister, Brittany Vise, also competed in pair skating.

Tiffany Vise married Don Baldwin on August 23, 2015, in San Diego, California.

== Career ==
=== Early years ===
Vise began skating at age four. She is right-handed, but spins "lefty" (clockwise). She competed with Ryan Bradley from 1997 to 1998. Following that partnership, she teamed up with Laureano Ibarra. She competed with Ibarra at the World Junior Championships, placing 6th, and on the ISU Junior Grand Prix series.

=== Partnership with Trent ===
Vise teamed up with Derek Trent in July 2003. They had skated for years at the same rink and his partnership had ended at the same time. Because they were both partnerless, they tried out together, despite the fact that they rotate in opposite directions. Very few teams at the highest level rotate in opposite directions because it makes elements like pair spins and twists much more difficult, due to the fact that one partner will have to "force" him- or herself to rotate in the "wrong" direction in order to complete the element (Vise spun his way on twist lifts). They represented the Broadmoor Skating Club.

Vise/Trent won the bronze medal at their first major event together, the 2003 Golden Spin of Zagreb. Beginning in the 2006–2007 season, Vise/Trent began attempting a throw quadruple salchow jump in competition. At the 2006 Skate Canada International, they were credited with fully rotating the element but not with landing it successfully.

Vise/Trent began the 2007–2008 season at the 2007 Skate Canada, where they placed 5th. During the free skate at the 2007 Trophée Eric Bompard, they became the first-ever pair to successfully execute a throw quad salchow in an international competition. They won the pewter medal at the 2008 U.S. Championships and were sent to the 2008 Four Continents, where they placed 8th.

In the 2008–2009 season, Vise/Trent placed 5th at the 2008 Skate Canada International and the 2008 Trophée Eric Bompard. They placed 8th at the 2009 U.S. Championships. The pair was coached by Doug Ladret and Jill Watson in Scottsdale, Arizona.

On April 30, 2009, Trent announced his retirement from competitive figure skating.

=== Partnership with Baldwin ===
Vise teamed up with Don Baldwin in March 2009. They won the senior pairs' event at the Pacific Coast Sectional Championships. Internationally, the pair won silver at the 2010 Ice Challenge in Graz, Austria, and bronze at the 2012 U.S. International Figure Skating Classic. They received three Grand Prix assignments and finished 6th at all three events. They were coached by Lara Ladret and Doug Ladret in Scottsdale, Arizona.

Vise/Baldwin announced their retirement from competition in April 2013 and said that they would coach together at the Ice Den in Scottsdale, Arizona.

== Programs ==
=== With Baldwin ===
| Season | Short program | Free skating |
|---|---|---|
| 2012–2013 | "Don't Let Me Be Misunderstood" by Santa Esmeralda; Open Arms | Legends of the Fall by James Horner; Time to Say Goodbye by Francesco Sartori performed by Erich Kunzel |
| 2011–2012 | Pirates of the Caribbean by Klaus Badelt | Legends of the Fall by James Horner; Time to Say Goodbye by Francesco Sartori performed by Erich Kunzel |
| 2010–2011 | Pirates of the Caribbean by Klaus Badelt | Mona Lisa Overdrive by Juno Reactor; Gabriel's Oboe by Ennio Morricone |
| 2009–2010 | Don't Let Me Be Misunderstood by Santa Esmeralda | Mona Lisa Overdrive by Juno Reactor; Gabriel's Oboe by Ennio Morricone; Transformers by Steve Jablonsky |

=== With Trent ===
| Season | Short program | Free skating |
|---|---|---|
| 2008–2009 | Sweet Remembrance of You by William Joseph | Heroes; Return with Honor by William Joseph |
| 2007–2008 | Harem by Sarah Brightman; Harem (Near Eastern Lounge) by Claude Challe choreo. by Tiffany Vise, Derek Trent | Les Misérables by Alain Boublil, Claude-Michel Schönberg choreo. by Doug Ladret, Tiffany Vise, Derek Trent |
| 2006–2007 | Shall We Dance?; Dance with Me choreo. by Catarina Lindgren | Les Misérables choreo. by Doug Ladret |
| 2005–2006 | Shall We Dance?; Dance with Me choreo. by Catarina Lindgren | Quidam (from Cirque du Soleil) choreo. by Catarina Lindgren |
| 2004–2005 | The Italian Job choreo. by Catarina Lindgren | Quidam (from Cirque du Soleil) choreo. by Catarina Lindgren |
| 2003–2004 | The Italian Job choreo. by Catarina Lindgren | Nights in White Satin by The Moody Blues choreo. by Catarina Lindgren |

=== With Ibarra ===
| Season | Short program | Free skating |
|---|---|---|
| 2001–2002 | Nessun Dorma (from Turandot) by Giacomo Puccini | Four Seasons by Antonio Vivaldi |

== Competitive highlights ==
GP: Grand Prix; JGP: Junior Grand Prix

=== With Baldwin ===
International
| Event | 09–10 | 10–11 | 11–12 | 12–13 |
|---|---|---|---|---|
| GP Rostelecom Cup | | | | 6th |
| GP Skate America | | | 6th | |
| GP Skate Canada | | | | 6th |
| Ice Challenge | | 2nd | | |
| Nebelhorn Trophy | | | 7th | |
| U.S. Classic | | | | 3rd |
National
| U.S. Championships | 8th | 6th | 9th | 10th |

=== With Trent ===
International
| Event | 03–04 | 04–05 | 05–06 | 06–07 | 07–08 | 08–09 |
|---|---|---|---|---|---|---|
| Four Continents | | | | | 8th | |
| GP Bompard | | | | | 4th | 5th |
| GP Skate America | | | | 6th | | |
| GP Skate Canada | | | | 5th | 5th | 5th |
| Golden Spin | 3rd | | | | | |
| Nebelhorn Trophy | | | | | 5th | |
| Schäfer Memorial | | | 3rd | | | |
National
| U.S. Championships | 13th | 9th | 6th | 5th | 4th | 8th |

=== With Ibarra ===
International
| Event | 2001–02 | 2002–03 |
|---|---|---|
| World Junior Championships | 6th | |
| JGP China | | 2nd |
| JGP Slovakia | | 3rd |
National
| U.S. Championships | 3rd J | 11th |
