= Don Baldwin (figure skater) =

American former competitive pair skater

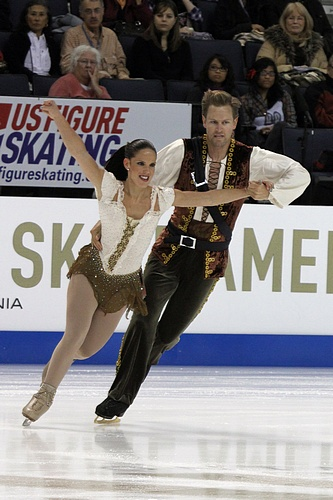
- Baldwin with Vise in 2011

Personal information
- Born: November 15, 1977 (age 49) Evanston, Illinois
- Home town: Peoria, Arizona

Figure skating career
- Country: United States
- Partner: Tiffany Vise
- Skating club: Los Angeles FSC
- Began skating: 1979
- Retired: April 4, 2013

Don Baldwin (born November 15, 1977) is an American former competitive pair skater. With Tiffany Vise, he is the 2010 Ice Challenge silver medalist and 2012 U.S. International Figure Skating Classic bronze medalist. They were a mirror pair team, with Baldwin spinning counter-clockwise and Vise spinning clockwise.

== Personal life ==
Baldwin has a Bachelor of Science degree in Mechanical and Aerospace Engineering. He is the brother of John Baldwin, also a competitive pair skater, and the son of John Baldwin, Sr.

Don Baldwin married Tiffany Vise on August 23, 2015, in San Diego, California.

== Career ==
Early in his career, Baldwin competed with his sister Donna as well as Jennifer Brunn.

He teamed up with Tiffany Vise in March 2009. They won the senior pairs' event at the Pacific Coast Sectional Championships. Internationally, the pair won silver at the 2010 Ice Challenge in Graz, Austria, and bronze at the 2012 U.S. International Figure Skating Classic. They received three Grand Prix assignments and finished 6th at all three events. They were coached by Lara Ladret and Doug Ladret in Scottsdale, Arizona.

They announced their retirement from competition on April 4, 2013 and said that they would coach together at the Ice Den in Scottsdale, Arizona.

== Programs ==
(with Vise)

Season	Short program	Free skating
2012–2013	Don't Let Me Be Misunderstood by Santa Esmeralda; Open Arms	Legends of the Fall by James Horner; Time to Say Goodbye by Francesco Sartori performed by Erich Kunzel
2011–2012	Pirates of the Caribbean by Klaus Badelt	Legends of the Fall by James Horner; Time to Say Goodbye by Francesco Sartori performed by Erich Kunzel
2010–2011	Pirates of the Caribbean by Klaus Badelt	Mona Lisa Overdrive by Juno Reactor; Gabriel's Oboe by Ennio Morricone
2009–2010	"Don't Let Me Be Misunderstood" by Santa Esmeralda	Mona Lisa Overdrive by Juno Reactor; Gabriel's Oboe by Ennio Morricone; Transformers by Steve Jablonsky

== Competitive highlights ==
GP: Grand Prix

=== Pairs with Vise ===
International
Event	09–10	10–11	11–12	12–13
GP Rostelecom Cup				6th
GP Skate America			6th	
GP Skate Canada				6th
Ice Challenge		2nd		
Nebelhorn Trophy			7th	
U.S. Classic				3rd
National
U.S. Champ.	8th	6th	9th	10th

=== Pairs with Brunn ===
National
Event	08-09
U.S. Champ.	18th

=== Pairs with Matson ===
National
Event	02-03
U.S. Champ.	16th

=== Men's singles ===
National
Event	97-98	98-99	99-00	00-01	01-02
U.S. Champ.	5th J	2nd J	12th	16th	16th
J = Junior
