= Constantine (soundtrack) =

Constantine (Original Motion Picture Soundtrack)

Film score by Brian Tyler and Klaus Badelt
- Released: February 15, 2005
- Studio: Todd-AO, Hollywood
- Genre: Film score
- Length: 51:32
- Label: Varèse Sarabande
- Producer: Brian Tyler; Klaus Badelt

Brian Tyler chronology
Godsend (2004)	Constatine (2005)	The Greatest Game Ever Played (2005)

Klaus Badelt chronology
Catwoman (2004)	Constatine (2005)	The Promise (2005)

Constantine (Original Motion Picture Soundtrack) is the film score to the 2005 film Constantine directed by Francis Lawrence starring Keanu Reeves, Rachel Weisz, Shia LaBeouf, Tilda Swinton, Pruitt Taylor Vince, Djimon Hounsou, Gavin Rossdale and Peter Stormare. The film score is composed by Brian Tyler and Klaus Badelt, and was released through Varèse Sarabande label on February 15, 2005.

== Background ==
Tyler met Lawrence and editor Wayne Wahrmann during the summer of 2004 and showcased an early cut of the film which he found "terrific" and told them some ideas of what he wanted to accomplish if he was to compose the score. A week later, he was brought onboard to score music for Constantine. Coming up with the initial ideas, he decided to write themes for John Constantine where he wanted to convey the feeling of dread and ancient religious beauty while acknowledging the film noir quality of the protagonist. Lawrence was supportive throughout Tyler's composition and wanted to bring his own style to the film.

By January 2005, Tyler recorded 110 minutes of music at the Todd-AO Scoring Stage. However, some of the studio executives note the score was too dark and needed some humor. Due to the time constraints, the producers brought on Badelt to collaborate on the new material, while Tyler would conduct the score and mix it with the rest of the material. Tyler noted that Badelt's score had a modular quality, and had brought an electronic element to the score which was not previously there, while also using samplers to the parts composed afterwards.

== Track listing ==
No.	Title	Music	Length
1.	"Destiny"	Klaus Badelt	2:00
2.	"The Cross Over"	Brian Tyler	2:42
3.	"Meet John Constantine"	Klaus Badelt	2:39
4.	"Confession"	Brian Tyler; Klaus Badelt	2:32
5.	"Deo Et Patri"	Brian Tyler	1:16
6.	"Counterweight"	Brian Tyler; Klaus Badelt	2:47
7.	"Into the Light"	Brian Tyler	2:53
8.	"I Left Her Alone"	Klaus Badelt	1:40
9.	"Resurrection"	Brian Tyler	2:04
10.	"Circle of Hell"	Klaus Badelt; Ian Honeyman	5:38
11.	"Last Rites"	Klaus Badelt	1:55
12.	"Encountering A Twin"	Brian Tyler; Klaus Badelt	1:06
13.	"Flight to Ravenscar"	Klaus Badelt	0:52
14.	"Humanity"	Brian Tyler	2:58
15.	"John"	Klaus Badelt	1:31
16.	"Someone Was Here"	Klaus Badelt; Ian Honeyman	1:44
17.	"Hell Freeway"	Brian Tyler; Klaus Badelt	2:43
18.	"Ether Surfing"	Klaus Badelt	1:13
19.	"The Balance"	Brian Tyler	2:26
20.	"Abentee Landlords"	Brian Tyler	1:35
21.	"John's Solitude"	Klaus Badelt	1:25
22.	"Lucifer"	Brian Tyler	1:56
23.	"Rooftop"	Klaus Badelt	1:18
24.	"Constantine End Titles"	Klaus Badelt	2:39
Total length:			51:32

== Reception ==
Jonathan Broxton of Movie Music UK wrote "Ultimately, the soundtrack album of Constantine is a bit of a mess, and it's a great shame that Tyler's score as originally envisioned will never legally see the light of day. There are still a number of excellent moments fighting to emerge from the watered-down, Badeltised miasma, and admirers of scores such as Darkness Falls or Terror Tract will certainly find things to enjoy. It's just that, as you listen, you can't help wondering how much better it would have been had Warner Brothers not stuck their grubby little fingers into the pot. Again." Christian Clemmensen of Filmtracks wrote "Tyler's music is nothing earth-shattering, but it's certainly intriguingly satisfying and would have translated much better onto album without the additions of Badelt's rather cheapening contemporary influences." James Christopher Monger of AllMusic wrote "Tyler does little to branch out from the trappings of the traditional modern thriller soundtrack, but it's serviceable enough that it never interrupts the flow of the film; rather, it barely registers, which depending on your opinion of how a score should interact with its respective piece of celluloid is either a good thing or a bad thing." Brian Lowry of Variety called it a "brooding score". A. O. Scott of The New York Times found the score to be "thrilling".

== Personnel ==
Credits adapted from liner notes:

Production

- Music composers and producers – Brian Tyler, Klaus Badelt
- Co-producer – Christopher Brooks
- Programming – Robert Williams
- Arrangements – Andrew Raiher, Ian Honeyman, Wolfram De Marco
- Recording and mixing – Alan Meyerson, Joel Iwataki
- Mastering – Erick Labson
- Music editors – Daryl Kell, Gary L. Krause, Joe Lisanti
- Musical assistance – Dante Dauz, Leslie Stevens, Matthew Margeson
- Music coordinator – Sinead V. Hartmann
- Copyist – Eric Stonerook
- Executive producer – Robert Townson

Orchestra

- Performer – Hollywood Studio Symphony
- Orchestration – Brad Warnaar, Dana Niu, Robert Elhai
- Orchestra conductor – Brian Tyler
- Orchestra contractor – Sandy DeCrescent
- Concertmaster – Endre Granat

Instruments

- Bass – Bruce Morgenthaler, Christian Kollgaard, David Parmeter, Drew Dembowski, Edward Meares, Gary Lasley, Michael Valerio, Neil Garber, Nico Carmine Abondolo, Nicolas Philippon, Oscar Hidalgo, Richard Feves, Steve Edelman, Susan Ranney, Timothy Eckert, Tim Powell, Trey Henry
- Bassoon – David Riddles, Michael O'Donovan
- Cello – Andrew Shulman, Anthony Cooke, Armen Ksajikian, Cecilia Tsan, Christine Ermacoff, Dane Little, David Low, David Speltz, Dennis Karmazyn, Douglas Davis, Jodi Burnett, John Walz, Kevan Torfeh, Larry Corbett, Martin Tillman, Matthew Cooker, Paul Cohen, Paula Hochhalter, Roger Lebow, Sebastian Toettcher, Stan Sharp, Steve Erdody, Steve Richards, Timothy Landauer, Todd Hemmenway, Trevor Handy, Victor Lawrence
- Clarinet – Gary Bovyer, James Kanter, Ralph Williams, Steven Roberts
- Electric cello – Martin Tillman
- Flute – Chris Bleth, David Shostac, Geraldine Rotella, Heather Clark, James Walker, Louise Ditullio, Stephen Kujala
- Guitar – George Doering
- Harp – Jo Ann Turovsky
- Horn – Brian O'Connor, Daniel Kelley, David Duke, Elizabeth Cook-Shen, James Thatcher, John Reynolds, Kristy Morrell, Kurt Snyder, Mark Adams, Phillip Edward Yao, Richard Todd, Steven Becknell
- Keyboards – Bryan Pezzone, Michael Lang, Randy Kerber
- Percussion – Alan Estes, Robert Zimmitti, Donald Williams, Emil Radocchia, Gregory Goodall, Peter Limonick, Steven Schaeffer
- Trombone – Alan Kaplan, Alexander Iles, Andrew Thomas Malloy, William Reichenbach, Phillip Teele, Steven Holtman
- Trumpet – Jon Lewis, Rick Baptist, Warren Luening
- Tuba – Fred Greene, Tommy J. Johnson
- Viola – Andrew Picken, Brian Dembow, Cassandra Richburg, Dan Neufeld, Daniel Seidenberg, Darrin Mc Cann, David Walther, Denyse Buffum, Jennie Hansen, John Scanlon, Keith Greene, Marlow Fisher, Matthew Funes, Michael Nowak, Piotr Jandula, Rick Gerding, Robert Becker, Robert Berg, Roland Kato, Samuel Formicola, Shanti Randall, Shawn Mann, Simon Oswell, Steven Gordon, Thomas Diener, Victoria Miskolczy
- Violin – Aimee Kreston, Amy Hershberger, Ana Landauer, Anatoly Rosinsky, Bruce Dukov, Clayton Haslop, Darius Campo, Dimitrie Leivici, Eric Hosler, Eun-Mee Ahn, Franklyn D'Antonio, Irina Voloshina, Jackie Brand, Jay Rosen, Jeanne-Skrocki Evans, Joel Derouin, Julie Ann Gigante, Katia Popov, Kenneth Yerke, Kevin Connolly, Laurence Greenfield, Liane Mautner, Lisa Sutton, Marc Sazer, Marina Manukian, Mario De Leon, Michael Markman, Michele Richards, Miran Kojian, Miwako Watanabe, Natalie Leggett, Norman Hughes, Peter Kent, Phillip Levy, Rene Mandel, Richard Altenbach, Roberto Cani, Robin Olson, Roger Wilkie, Sara Parkins, Sarah Thornblade, Shalini Vijayan, Sid Page, Song-A Lee-Kitto, Sungil Lee, Tamara Hatwan
- Woodwind – Christopher Bleth

Choir

- Choir – Hollywood Film Chorale
- Vocal contractor – Sally Stevens

Vocalists

- Alto – Aleta Braxton, Bobbi Page, Carmen Twillie, Donna Medine, Edie Lehmann Boddicker, Leanna Brand, Luana Jackman, Melissa Mackay, Sheri Izzard, Susan Boyd
- Bass-baritone – Bob Joyce, Guy Maeda, John West, Jon Joyce, Kenneth Knight, Mark Beasom, Michael Geiger
- Soprano – Diane Freiman Reynolds, Elin Carlson, Jennifer Graham, Joanna Bushnell, Linda Harmon, Sally Stevens, Samela Beasom, Susie Logan, Teri Koide, Terry Harriton, Virenia Lind
- Tenor – Agostino Castagnola, Richard Wells, Dwayne Condon, John Beeney, Jonathan Mack, Rick Logan, Stephen Amerson, Walt Harrah

== Accolades ==
Award	Date of the ceremony	Category	Recipients	Result	Ref.
International Film Music Critics Association	February 23, 2006	Best Original Score for a Horror/Thriller Film	Brian Tyler and Klaus Badelt	Nominated	
