= Barbara Lorenz =

- Occupation: makeup artist
- Years active: 1966-Present

Barbara Lorenz is a make-up artist who has done over 110 films and TV shows. She was nominated at the 75th Academy Awards in the category of Best Makeup for the film The Time Machine. She shared her nomination with John M. Elliott Jr.

She also received an Emmy nomination for Their Eyes Were Watching God, sharing the nomination with Alan D'Angerio.

Also received 2017 Lifetime Achievement Award in Hairstyling for The Makeup Artist and Hairstylist Guild.
