= Carl Fullerton =

American make-up artist

- Occupation: Make-up artist

Carl Fullerton is an American make-up artist. He was nominated for two Academy Awards in the category Best Makeup and Hairstyling for the films Remo Williams: The Adventure Begins and Philadelphia.

== Selected filmography ==
- Remo Williams: The Adventure Begins (1985)
- Philadelphia (1993; co-nominated with Alan D'Angerio)
