= Derek Trent =

American former competitive pair skater (born 1980)

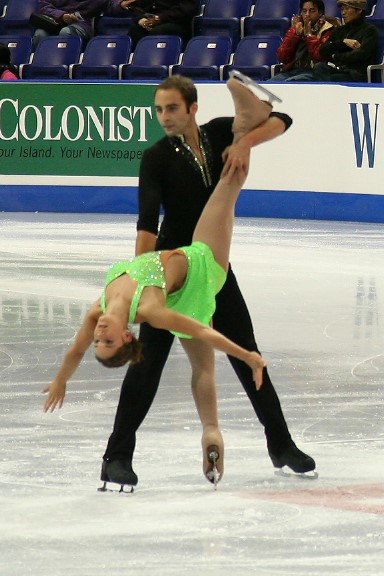
- Vise & Trent in 2006.

Personal information
- Born: March 21, 1980 (age 46) Knoxville, Tennessee, U.S.
- Height: 6 ft 0 in (1.83 m)

Figure skating career
- Country: United States
- Skating club: Broadmoor SC
- Retired: April 30, 2009

Derek Trent (born March 21, 1980) is an American former competitive pair skater. He competed for most of his career with Tiffany Vise. On November 17, 2007, Vise and Trent landed the first clean throw quadruple salchow jump in international competition. They officially became the first team to perform that element in international competition.

Because Vise spun and jumped in the clockwise direction and Trent in the counter-clockwise direction. They were a mirror pair.

== Personal life ==
Derek Trent was born in Knoxville, Tennessee. He has two sisters, Kelli and Laura. In 2002, he graduated from the University of Colorado at Colorado Springs with a degree in business and a minor in Spanish. In May 2008, he completed his MBA at the same university.

== Skating career ==
=== Early years ===
Trent began skating in 1987. At age ten, he moved to Colorado Springs, Colorado in order to train. Competing in ice dancing with Eve Chalom, he won the intermediate-level bronze medal at the U.S. Junior Figure Skating Championships in 1993. He and his sister, Kelli Trent, also competed together in ice dancing at the U.S. Junior Championships.

As a single skater, Trent placed 11th in the novice ranks at the 1996 U.S. Championships.

Trent began pair skating as a teenager, coached by Irina Vorobieva. He and Katie Gadkowski won the novice pewter medal at the 1998 U.S. Championships and the junior pewter medal at the 1999 U.S. Championships. With his next skating partner, Brandilyn Sandoval, he won the junior bronze medal at the 2001 U.S. Championships. When that partnership ended, he teamed up with Stacey Pensgen, who was switching from singles. They placed 14th at the 2003 U.S. Championships and parted ways shortly thereafter.

=== Partnership with Vise ===
Trent teamed up with Tiffany Vise in July 2003. They had skated for years at the same rink and her partnership had ended at the same time. Because they were both partnerless, they tried out together, despite the fact that they rotate in opposite directions. Very few teams at the highest level rotate in opposite directions because it makes elements like pair spins and twists much more difficult, due to the fact that one partner will have to "force" themself to rotate in the "wrong" direction in order to complete the element (Vise spun his way on twist lifts). They represented the Broadmoor Skating Club.

Vise/Trent won the bronze medal at their first major event together, the 2003 Golden Spin of Zagreb. Beginning in the 2006–2007 season, Vise/Trent began attempting a throw quadruple salchow jump in competition. At the 2006 Skate Canada International, they were credited with fully rotating the element but not with landing it successfully.

Vise/Trent began the 2007–2008 season at the 2007 Skate Canada, where they placed 5th. During the free skate at the 2007 Trophée Eric Bompard, they became the first-ever pair to successfully execute a throw quad salchow in an international competition. They won the pewter medal at the 2008 U.S. Championships and were sent to the 2008 Four Continents, where they placed 8th.

In the 2008–2009 season, Vise/Trent placed 5th at the 2008 Skate Canada International and the 2008 Trophée Eric Bompard. They placed 8th at the 2009 U.S. Championships. The pair was coached by Doug Ladret and Jill Watson in Scottsdale, Arizona.

On April 30, 2009, Trent announced his retirement from competitive figure skating.

=== Post-competitive ===
Trent works as a coach. He is certified as a judge on the national level.

== Programs ==
(with Vise)

Season	Short program	Free skating
2008–2009	Sweet Remembrance of You by William Joseph	Heroes; Return with Honor by William Joseph
2007–2008	Harem by Sarah Brightman; Harem (Near Eastern Lounge) by Claude Challe choreo. by Tiffany Vise, Derek Trent	Les Misérables by Alain Boublil, Claude-Michel Schönberg choreo. by Doug Ladret
2006–2007	Shall We Dance?; Dance with Me choreo. by Catarina Lindgren	Les Misérables by Alain Boublil, Claude-Michel Schönberg choreo. by Doug Ladret
2005–2006	Shall We Dance?; Dance with Me choreo. by Catarina Lindgren	Quidam (from Cirque du Soleil) choreo. by Catarina Lindgren
2004–2005	The Italian Job choreo. by Catarina Lindgren	Quidam (from Cirque du Soleil) choreo. by Catarina Lindgren
2003–2004	The Italian Job choreo. by Catarina Lindgren	Nights in White Satin by The Moody Blues choreo. by Catarina Lindgren

== Competitive highlights ==
GP: Grand Prix; JGP: Junior Grand Prix

=== With Vise ===
International
Event	03–04	04–05	05–06	06–07	07–08	08–09
Four Continents					8th	
GP Bompard					4th	5th
GP Skate America				6th		
GP Skate Canada				5th	5th	5th
Golden Spin	3rd					
Nebelhorn Trophy					5th	
Schäfer Memorial			3rd			
National
U.S. Champ.	13th	9th	6th	5th	4th	8th
Midwestern Sect.		2nd	1st	1st		

=== With Pensgen ===
Event	2002–2003
U.S. Championships	14th

=== With Sandoval ===
International
Event	2000–2001
JGP China	5th
National
U.S. Championships	3rd J
J = Junior level

=== With Gadkowski ===
International
Event	1997–1998	1998–1999
JGP Hungary		10th
National
U.S. Championships	4th N	4th J
Levels: N = Novice; J = Junior

=== Singles career ===
Event	1995–1996
U.S. Championships	11th N
N = Novice level
