= The Purge (soundtrack) =

The Purge (Original Motion Picture Soundtrack)

Film score by Nathan Whitehead
- Released: June 4, 2013
- Recorded: 2013
- Genre: Film score
- Length: 60:40
- Label: Back Lot Music
- Producer: Nathan Whitehead

Nathan Whitehead chronology
Family Bum (2013)	The Purge (2013)	A Cool Dark Place (2013)

The Purge (Original Motion Picture Soundtrack) is the film score to the 2013 film The Purge directed by James DeMonaco and stars Ethan Hawke, Lena Headey, Adelaide Kane, and Max Burkholder. The film score is composed by Nathan Whitehead, an assistant of Steve Jablonsky in his maiden film as a sole composer and released through Back Lot Music on June 4, 2013.

== Background ==
Nathan Whitehead composed the film score in his sole composition stint after being worked on several collaborative projects with co-composers. He was recommended by Steve Jablonsky to the executives of Platinum Dunes, one of the co-producers. After receiving a call from the producers, immediately went to watch the film without reading the script or premise, which he felt "a really great way to get introduced to the film" to have minimal knowledge about the film letting it speak for itself. He added,

"The first thing I thought was, "This is a terrifying idea" and then, "Wait, could this really happen!?" The more I thought about it, the less far-fetched it seemed and that slow, creeping question of "What are we really capable of?" made it much more frightening."

Whitehead eventually came up with musical ideas immediately after watching the film. After the premiere, he locked himself in the studio over that weekend and thought about the worldbuilding of that film, despite initial skepticism, and then churned out ideas. Being his first theatrically released feature film as a sole composer, he found more freedom in creating the overall shape and tone of the score thereby being more involved in the film and in touch with the story. Upon his experience of being a sole composer, Whitehead said,

"This experience just reinforced the idea that my job is really always about collaboration, and I love that about it. Whether I'm working with a director one-on-one or if I'm working with other composers, it's always collaborative, and I want to do my best to contribute to that in an honest way. I love hearing ideas from the director and from fellow composers. Sometimes we agree and sometimes we don't, but I think healthy collaboration really allows the best ideas to come to life. I've been very fortunate in my career to get to collaborate with amazing composers, orchestrators, music editors, etc. and that has been incredibly educational [...] As to what I prefer for my own composing, right now I am very excited to do more work on my own. I look forward to being able to really shape ideas from start to finish over the course of a project, keeping in mind that collaboration will always be a critical part of the job."

Whitehead considered The Purge as a thriller film in several ways and had a huge effect on his musical approach. Much of the classic horror instrumentation and orchestration did not fit well for the film. Hence, the thriller nature and the futuristic science fiction elements steered the music into "grittier textures and more processed sounds". Some of the traditional horror moments were viewed through the lens of the futuristic America and are manipulated one way or another. The score was more of the setting that took place overnight immersing in the world of Sandins, their burden and inner turmoil and how they face the threats while dealing with the Purge, but it also makes them question themselves, whether they are good people. Hence the score really speaks to the internal elements.

The entire score was written in three weeks and recorded in a month's duration.

== Release ==
Back Lot Music released the film's soundtrack on June 4, 2013, featuring 30 tracks.

== Track listing ==
No.	Title	Length
1.	"You're Number One"	1:49
2.	"Let's Growl"	2:05
3.	"Timmy"	0:52
4.	"Charlie's Secret Room"	1:02
5.	"Lockdown"	1:04
6.	"Family"	0:27
7.	"I Came to See Your Father"	1:18
8.	"Emergency Services Will Be Suspended"	1:16
9.	"This Night Saved Our Country"	0:53
10.	"The Purge Is Working"	3:04
11.	"Who Needs A Car On A Boat?"	3:02
12.	"Zoey's Gone"	2:07
13.	"Be Careful, OK?"	0:23
14.	"You Need to See This"	1:59
15.	"Toodaloo, Sandins"	3:18
16.	"Charlie Watches"	1:01
17.	"James And The Stranger"	0:30
18.	"That Will Be Thee"	4:27
19.	"There Are People Outside"	2:21
20.	"I Am Not Dying Tonight"	1:57
21.	"Nothing Is Ever Going To Be OK Again"	5:50
22.	"I Bid Thee Farewell"	5:10
23.	"Are You Hurt?"	1:30
24.	"Release The Beast"	1:57
25.	"Your Soul Has Been Cleansed"	2:10
26.	"Neighbors"	1:29
27.	"Thank You"	1:14
28.	"Ours, Not Theirs"	2:46
29.	"Blessed Be the New Founding Fathers"	1:34
30.	"No More Killing Tonight"	2:05
Total length:		60:40

== Reception ==
Leslie Felperin of Variety, Neil Young of The Hollywood Reporter and Tim Grierson of Screen International described the score as "thrilling", "suspenseful" and "terrific". "Nathan Whitehead's original music enhances the suspense without forcing it". JD Duran of InSession Film wrote "Nathan Whitehead gets the nod here to score and does a pretty good job. As an assistant under my main man Steve Jablonsky, Whitehead has done some good work before. The score adds some thrilling touches and does it's job well for a genre that gets very predictable. The tones are screeching, very stringy and mostly what you think it would be. It has a few musical elements in a few small parts and isn't one you'd probably listen to outside the film."

== Accolades ==
Awards	Category	Recipient(s) and nominee(s)	Result	Ref.
ASCAP Film and Television Music Awards	Top Box Office Films	Nathan Whitehead	Won	
