= Philadelphia (film) =

1993 legal drama film by Jonathan Demme

- Theatrical release poster
- Directed by: Jonathan Demme
- Written by: Ron Nyswaner
- Produced by: Jonathan Demme; Edward Saxon
- Starring: Tom Hanks; Denzel Washington; Jason Robards; Mary Steenburgen; Antonio Banderas; Joanne Woodward
- Cinematography: Tak Fujimoto
- Edited by: Craig McKay
- Music by: Howard Shore
- Production company: Clinica Estetico Productions
- Distributed by: TriStar Pictures
- Release dates: December 14, 1993 (Los Angeles); January 14, 1994 (United States)
- Running time: 125 minutes
- Country: United States
- Language: English
- Budget: $26 million
- Box office: $206.7 million

Philadelphia is a 1993 American legal drama film directed and produced by Jonathan Demme, written by Ron Nyswaner, and starring Tom Hanks and Denzel Washington. Filmed on location in its namesake city, it tells the story of attorney Andrew Beckett (Hanks) who comes to ask a personal injury attorney, Joe Miller (Washington), to help him sue his former law firm, who fired him after discovering he was gay and that he had AIDS. The cast also features Jason Robards, Mary Steenburgen, Antonio Banderas, and Joanne Woodward.

Philadelphia is one of the first mainstream Hollywood films not only to explicitly address HIV/AIDS and homophobia, but also to portray gay people in a positive light. It premiered in Los Angeles on December 14, 1993, in a benefit for the AIDS Project, and opened in limited release on December 22, before expanding into wide release by TriStar Pictures on January 14, 1994. It grossed $206.7 million worldwide, becoming the 9th highest-grossing film of 1993.

The film was positively received by critics for its screenplay and the performances of Hanks and Washington. For his performance as Andrew Beckett, Hanks won Best Actor at the 66th Academy Awards, while the song "Streets of Philadelphia" by Bruce Springsteen won Best Original Song. Nyswaner was also nominated for the Best Original Screenplay, but lost to Jane Campion for The Piano.

In 2025, the film was selected for preservation in the United States National Film Registry by the Library of Congress as being "culturally, historically or aesthetically significant."

== Plot ==
In the early 1990s, Andrew Beckett is a senior associate at Philadelphia's law firm Wyant, Wheeler, Hellerman, Tetlow, & Brown. He conceals his homosexuality and his status as an AIDS patient from others in the office. A partner in the firm, Walter Kenton, notices a lesion on Beckett's forehead. Although Beckett attributes the lesion to a racquetball injury, it indicates Kaposi's sarcoma, an AIDS-defining condition.

Beckett is given an important lawsuit to file before the statute of limitations runs out in 10 days. He works from home which gives him the opportunity to mask his lesions. On the tenth day, he is advised the lawsuit file is missing with no copies to be found. The paperwork is found and the suit filed on time, but Beckett is fired due to his incompetence. Beckett believes he was terminated because of his disease and his homosexuality, and asks personal injury attorney, Joe Miller, to represent him in a wrongful termination suit. Initially Miller declines, fearful of contracting the disease and uncomfortable representing a homosexual. Miller eventually agrees to take Beckett's case after witnessing discrimination against Beckett at a law library.

As the case goes to trial, the partners of the firm take the stand, each claiming that Beckett was incompetent and that he had deliberately tried to hide his condition. The defense distinguishes Beckett, who contracted the disease after having sex with strangers, with a former employee of one of the law partners, who contracted the disease after a blood transfusion. To contradict that Beckett's condition was unknown, Miller asks Beckett to unbutton his shirt while on the witness stand, revealing lesions that appeared to be the same as those on his face when employed. Throughout the trial, Miller's homophobia slowly disappears as he and Beckett bond from working together.

Beckett collapses and is hospitalized after Charles Wheeler, the partner he most admired, testifies against him. Another partner, Bob Seidman, confesses that he suspected Beckett had AIDS but never told anyone and refused to let him discuss it, which he deeply regrets. During Beckett's hospital stay, the jury deliberates. The foreman reasons the firm would have never given Beckett such an important lawsuit to work if they believed he was incompetent. They award him back pay, damages for pain and suffering, and punitive damages, totaling over $5 million. Miller visits the visibly frail Beckett in the hospital after the verdict and overcomes his fear enough to touch Beckett's face. After the family leaves the room, Beckett tells his partner Miguel Alvarez that he is "ready". A memorial is held at Beckett's home, where many mourners, including Miller and his family as well as Bob Seidman, view home movies of Beckett as a happy child.

== Cast ==
- Tom Hanks as Andrew Beckett
- Denzel Washington as Joe Miller
- Jason Robards as Charles Wheeler
- Mary Steenburgen as Belinda Conine
- Antonio Banderas as Miguel Alvarez
- Joanne Woodward as Sarah Beckett
- Robert W. Castle as Bud Beckett
- Ann Dowd as Jill Beckett
- Adam LeFevre as Jill's husband
- John Bedford Lloyd as Matt Beckett
- Dan Olmstead as Randy Beckett
- Lisa Summerour as Lisa Miller
- Charles Napier as Judge Lucas Garnett
- Roberta Maxwell as Judge Tate
- Roger Corman as Mr. Roger Laird
- David Drake as Bruno
- Harry Northup as Juror No. 6
- Bill Rowe as Dr. Armbruster
- Chandra Wilson as Chandra
- Daniel von Bargen as Jury Foreman
- Karen Finley as Dr. Gillman
- Robert Ridgely as Walter Kenton
- Bradley Whitford as Jamey Collins
- Ron Vawter as Bob Seidman
- Anna Deavere Smith as Anthea Burton
- Obba Babatundé as Jerome Green
- Charles Glenn as Kenneth Killcoyne
- Tracey Walter as the Librarian
- Andre B. Blake as Young Man in Pharmacy (as André B. Blake)
- Daniel Chapman as Clinic Storyteller
- Peter Jacobs as Peter / Mona Lisa
- Paul Lazar as Dr. Klenstein
- Warren Miller as Mr. Finley
- Joey Perillo as Filko
- Lauren Roselli as Iris
- Lisa Talerico as Shelby
- Kathryn Witt as Melissa Benedict
- Julius Erving as himself
- Kenneth I. Starr as himself
- Mayor of Philadelphia Ed Rendell as himself
- The Flirtations as themselves
- Q Lazzarus as Party Singer
- Quentin Crisp as Party Guest (uncredited)

== Real-life inspirations ==
The events in the film are similar to the events in the lives of attorneys Geoffrey Bowers and Clarence Cain. Bowers was an attorney who, in 1987, sued the law firm Baker McKenzie for wrongful dismissal in one of the first AIDS discrimination cases. Cain was an attorney for Hyatt Legal Services who was fired after his employer found out he had AIDS. He sued Hyatt in 1990, and won just before his death.

In 1994, shortly after the film's release, Scott Burr, a former attorney with the Philadelphia firm of Kohn, Nast and Graf, sued his previous employer for illegally terminating him upon finding out that he was HIV positive. Like the defendants in the film, the firm claimed that it fired him for incompetence without knowing about his health. The parties settled the lawsuit for an undisclosed amount after three weeks of trial. Burr continued to practice law prior to his death in 2020.

=== Controversy ===
Bowers's family sued the writers and producers of the film. A year after Bowers's death in 1987, a producer, Scott Rudin, had interviewed the Bowers family and their lawyers, and, according to the family, promised compensation for the use of Bowers's story as a basis for a film. Family members asserted that 54 scenes in the movie were so similar to events in Bowers's life that some of them could only have come from their interviews. However, the defense said that Rudin had abandoned the project after hiring a writer and did not share any information the family had provided. The lawsuit was settled after five days of testimony. Although terms of the agreement were not released, the defendants did admit that "the film 'was inspired in part'" by Bowers' story.

== Production ==
In October 1987, 20th Century Fox pre-emptively acquired the rights to Alice Hoffman's then-upcoming novel At Risk, with Hoffman attached to adapt the novel herself. The project eventually moved to Orion Pictures, with Scott Rudin attached as a producer. Jonathan Demme was hired to direct the adaptation, prompting Rudin to exit the project, supposedly due to Demme's refusal to work with him. In 1988, Demme brought the project to screenwriter Ron Nyswaner, whom he had previously worked with on Swing Shift. Nyswaner was partially inspired to board the project by his nephew Kevin's recent diagnosis of HIV/AIDS; Kevin Nyswaner would subsequently succumb to complications of the virus on June 14, 1992 aged 21. While originally reported to be sharing a screenwriting credit with Hoffman, Nyswaner's original screenplay was ultimately based on newspaper clippings and articles on the subject of AIDS and deviated significantly from Hoffman's novel, which is centered on a young girl named Amanda Farrell who contracts the virus through an unscreened blood transfusion. Financial troubles forced Orion to sell the project, now retitled Probable Cause, to TriStar Pictures in June 1992. The project was once again renamed to People Like Us before finally settling on the title Philadelphia instead.

=== Casting ===
Andy Garcia was the first actor to be offered the role of Andrew Beckett, but was forced to leave the project due to scheduling conflicts; he would briefly return to the project but ultimately did not play the character. Daniel Day-Lewis was approached to replace Garcia, but turned the role down as he was already committed to In the Name of the Father. Matthew Modine and William Baldwin also expressed interest in taking over the role of Beckett before it ultimately went to Tom Hanks. Bill Murray, William Hurt, Nick Nolte, and Tim Robbins were among the actors considered for the character Joe Miller before the role went to Denzel Washington. To prepare for his role, Hanks read the works of author Paul Monette and worked with two personal trainers to shed 35 pounds of weight to depict the deterioration of Beckett's health as the film progresses.

John Leguizamo was offered the role of Miguel Álvarez but turned it down to play Luigi in the film Super Mario Bros.

In a June 2022 interview with The New York Times, Tom Hanks said that the film would not be made with a straight actor in a gay role in 2022, stating audiences would not "accept the inauthenticity of a straight guy playing a gay guy". Hanks added that this was "rightly so", stating "One of the reasons people weren't afraid of that movie is that I was playing a gay man".

TriStar Pictures initially refused to insure actor Ron Vawter, who was openly HIV-positive at the time, insisting Jonathan Demme recast him. Demme refused, even changing the shooting schedule to accommodate Vawter after he was hospitalized for a month. Vawter died of complications from AIDS less than five months after the film's premiere. The American Film Institute notes that of some 53 AIDS-positive actors who appeared in the film, 43 (including Vawter) died within a year of its release.

=== Filming ===
Principal photography commenced on October 21, 1992. The film was shot in-sequence (chronological order), as Hanks had to gradually lose weight over the course of the film, and to help the actor follow a clear emotional trajectory. Filming took place on-location in Philadelphia, with the courtroom scenes shot at City Hall. Other locations included the University of Pennsylvania library, Mount Sinai Hospital, Spectrum arena and Rittenhouse Square.

== Release ==
=== Theatrical release ===
Philadelphia premiered in Los Angeles on December 14, 1993 and opened in limited release in four theaters on December 22, before expanding into wide release on January 14, 1994. The Los Angeles premiere was a benefit for AIDS Project Los Angeles, which netted $250,000 APLA Chair Steve Tisch told the Los Angeles Times.

The film was the first Hollywood big-budget, big-star film to tackle the issue of AIDS in the United States (following the television film And the Band Played On) and signaled a shift in Hollywood films toward more realistic depictions of people in the LGBT community. According to a Tom Hanks interview for the 1995 documentary The Celluloid Closet, he was cast in the role due to his non-intimidating screen persona in order to allow for audiences to sympathize with a gay, HIV-positive character. However, scenes showing more affection between him and Banderas were cut, including one with him and Banderas in bed together. The DVD edition, produced by Automat Picture, includes this scene; according to Jonathan Demme, the scene was cut for pacing.

=== Home media ===
Philadelphia was released on VHS on June 29, 1994 and on DVD on September 10, 1997; it was later released as a limited edition Blu-ray through Twilight Time on May 14, 2013. In conjunction with the film's 25th anniversary, the film was released on 4K Blu-Ray on November 27, 2018.

The screenplay was also republished in a novelization by writer Christopher Davis in 1994.

== Reception ==
=== Box office ===
Philadelphia was originally released on December 22, 1993, in a limited opening of only four theaters, and had a weekend gross of $143,433 with an average of $35,858 per theater. The film expanded its release on January 14, 1994, to 1,245 theaters and went to number one at the US box office, grossing $13.8 million over the 4-day Martin Luther King Jr. Day weekend, averaging $11,098 per theater. The film stayed at number 1 the following weekend, earning another $8.8 million.

In its 14th weekend, the weekend after the Oscars, the film expanded to 888 theaters, and saw its gross increase by 70%, making $1.9 million and jumping from number 15 the previous weekend (when it made $1.1 million from 673 theaters), to return to the top ten ranking at number 8 that weekend.

Philadelphia eventually grossed $77.4 million in North America and $129.2 million overseas for a total of $206.7 million worldwide against a budget of $26 million, making it a significant box office success, and becoming the 12th highest-grossing film in the U.S. of 1993.

=== Critical response ===
On the review aggregator Rotten Tomatoes, Philadelphia holds an approval rating of 81% based on 64 reviews, with an average rating of 6.9/10. The site's critical consensus reads: "Philadelphia indulges in some unfortunate clichés in its quest to impart a meaningful message, but its stellar cast and sensitive direction are more than enough to compensate." Metacritic gave the film a weighted average score of 66 out of 100, based on 21 critics, indicating "generally favorable reviews". Audiences polled by CinemaScore gave the film an average grade of "A" on an A+ to F scale.

In a contemporary review for the Chicago Sun-Times, Roger Ebert gave the film three and a half out of four stars and said that it is "quite a good film, on its own terms. And for moviegoers with an antipathy to AIDS but an enthusiasm for stars like Tom Hanks and Denzel Washington, it may help to broaden understanding of the disease. It's a ground-breaker like Guess Who's Coming to Dinner (1967), the first major film about an interracial romance; it uses the chemistry of popular stars in a reliable genre to sidestep what looks like controversy."

Christopher Matthews from the Seattle Post-Intelligencer wrote "Jonathan Demme's long-awaited Philadelphia is so expertly acted, well-meaning and gutsy that you find yourself constantly pulling for it to be the definitive AIDS movie." James Berardinelli from ReelViews wrote "The story is timely and powerful, and the performances of Hanks and Washington assure that the characters will not immediately vanish into obscurity." Rita Kempley from The Washington Post wrote "It's less like a film by Demme than the best of Frank Capra. It is not just canny, corny and blatantly patriotic, but compassionate, compelling and emotionally devastating."

=== Year-end lists ===
- 8th – Dan Craft, The Pantagraph
- 8th – Joan Vadeboncoeur, Syracuse Herald American
- Honorable Mention – Dennis King, Tulsa World
- Honorable Mention – Bob Carlton, The Birmingham News

== Accolades ==
| Award | Category | Recipient(s) | Result |
|---|---|---|---|
| 20/20 Awards | Best Picture | | Nominated |
| 20/20 Awards | Best Director | Jonathan Demme | Nominated |
| 20/20 Awards | Best Actor | Tom Hanks | Won |
| 20/20 Awards | Best Original Screenplay | Ron Nyswaner | Nominated |
| 20/20 Awards | Best Original Song | "Philadelphia"; Music and Lyrics by Neil Young | Nominated |
| 20/20 Awards | Best Original Song | "Streets of Philadelphia"; Music and Lyrics by Bruce Springsteen | Won |
| Academy Awards | Best Actor | Tom Hanks | Won |
| Academy Awards | Best Screenplay – Written Directly for the Screen | Ron Nyswaner | Nominated |
| Academy Awards | Best Makeup | Carl Fullerton and Alan D'Angerio | Nominated |
| Academy Awards | Best Original Song | "Philadelphia"; Music and Lyrics by Neil Young | Nominated |
| Academy Awards | Best Original Song | "Streets of Philadelphia"; Music and Lyrics by Bruce Springsteen | Won |
| ASCAP Film and Television Music Awards | Top Box Office Films | Howard Shore | Won |
| ASCAP Film and Television Music Awards | Most Performed Songs from Motion Pictures | "Streets of Philadelphia" – Bruce Springsteen | Won |
| Artios Awards | Outstanding Achievement in Feature Film Casting – Drama | Howard Feuer | Nominated |
| Awards Circuit Community Awards | Best Motion Picture | Jonathan Demme and Edward Saxon | Won |
| Awards Circuit Community Awards | Best Director | Jonathan Demme | Nominated |
| Awards Circuit Community Awards | Best Actor in a Leading Role | Tom Hanks | Won |
| Awards Circuit Community Awards | Best Actor in a Leading Role | Denzel Washington | Nominated |
| Awards Circuit Community Awards | Best Original Screenplay | Ron Nyswaner | Won |
| Awards Circuit Community Awards | Best Makeup & Hairstyling | Carl Fullerton and Alan D'Angerio | Won |
| Awards Circuit Community Awards | Best Cast Ensemble | | Won |
| British Academy Film Awards | Best Original Screenplay | Ron Nyswaner | Nominated |
| Chicago Film Critics Association Awards | Best Director | Jonathan Demme | Nominated |
| Chicago Film Critics Association Awards | Best Actor | Tom Hanks | Nominated |
| Dallas–Fort Worth Film Critics Association Awards | Best Film | Tom Hanks | Nominated |
| Dallas–Fort Worth Film Critics Association Awards | Best Actor | | Nominated |
| GLAAD Media Awards | Outstanding Film | | Won |
| Golden Globe Awards | Best Actor in a Motion Picture – Drama | Tom Hanks | Won |
| Golden Globe Awards | Best Screenplay – Motion Picture | Ron Nyswaner | Nominated |
| Golden Globe Awards | Best Original Song – Motion Picture | "Streets of Philadelphia"; Music and Lyrics by Bruce Springsteen | Won |
| Golden Screen Awards | Golden Screen | | Won |
| Grammy Awards | Record of the Year | "Streets of Philadelphia" – Bruce Springsteen | Nominated |
| Grammy Awards | Song of the Year | "Streets of Philadelphia" – Bruce Springsteen | Won |
| Grammy Awards | Best Male Rock Vocal Performance | "Streets of Philadelphia" – Bruce Springsteen | Won |
| Grammy Awards | Best Rock Song | "Streets of Philadelphia" – Bruce Springsteen | Won |
| Grammy Awards | Best Song Written Specifically for a Motion Picture or for Television | "Streets of Philadelphia" – Bruce Springsteen | Won |
| MTV Movie Awards | Best Movie | | Nominated |
| MTV Movie Awards | Best Male Performance | Tom Hanks | Won |
| MTV Movie Awards | Best On-Screen Team | Tom Hanks and Denzel Washington | Nominated |
| MTV Movie Awards | Best Song from a Movie | Bruce Springsteen – "Streets of Philadelphia" | Nominated |
| MTV Video Music Awards | Best Video from a Film | Bruce Springsteen – "Streets of Philadelphia" | Won |
| National Board of Review Awards | Top Ten Films | | 7th Place |
| Political Film Society Awards | Human Rights | | Nominated |
| Turkish Film Critics Association Awards | Best Foreign Film | | 16th Place |
| Writers Guild of America Awards | Best Screenplay – Written Directly for the Screen | Ron Nyswaner | Nominated |

=== American Film Institute ===
- AFI's 100 Years...100 Heroes & Villains
  - Andrew Beckett – #49 (Heroes)
- AFI's 100 Years...100 Cheers: America's Most Inspiring Movies – #20

== Soundtrack ==
A soundtrack album was released in January 1994, by Epic Soundtrax containing the main music featured in the film.

== See also ==
- Art of the AIDS Crisis
- List of American films of 1993
- Media portrayal of HIV/AIDS
- Philadelphia lawyer
