= Lilli the Witch =

Children's book series by Knister

The first book of the series.

Lilli the Witch (German: Hexe Lilli) is a series of children's books by the German author Knister, illustrated by graphic designer Birgit Rieger. The series has been adapted for film and television.

== History and adaptations ==
The Lilli books have been published by the German publisher Arena Verlag since 1992. Starting with Lilli the Witch and the Magic Homework, author Knister and illustrator Birgit Rieger worked together on more than 40 books over the years. Beside the original series, there is a series for first readers, a non-fiction series, Learn & Play titles, books that accompany the TV cartoon series inspired by Lilli the Witch and other miscellaneous print and non-print products that are related to the books. The series has been translated into 35 languages and over 17 million copies have been sold worldwide.

The live action film Lilly the Witch: The Dragon and the Magic Book was released in 2009 and featured in over 40 countries. It was nominated for the Deutscher Filmpreis (German Film Award) in the category "Best Children's Film". The sequel, Lilly the Witch: The Journey to Mandolan, was set in India and was released in February 2011. A third film, Lilly's Bewitched Christmas, was released in 2017.

Magic Lilly, a CGI reboot series based on the books, is currently in production and is slated for 2027.

== Premise ==
Lilli is an ordinary girl, until the day she stumbles upon a magic book which turns her into a witch. From then on she experiences various adventures that take her all over the world. She is often accompanied by her younger brother Leon, and her friend Hector, a small green dragon.

== Lilli the Witch - Books ==
=== Original Series ===
- 1: Lilli the Witch Turns School Upside Down, 978-3-401-04491-0
- 2: Lilli the Witch – Conjured Havoc!, 978-3-401-04492-7
- 3: Lilli the Witch – Circus Charms, 978-3-401-04534-4
- 4: Lilli the Witch and the Pirates, 978-3-401-04547-4
- 5: Lilli the Witch and Magic Christmas, 978-3-401-04551-1
- 6: Lilli the Witch Turns Private Eye, 978-3-401-04631-0
- 7: Lilli the Witch and the Wild Wild West, 978-3-401-04687-7
- 8: Lilli the Witch and the Wild Indians, 978-3-401-04764-5
- 9: Lilli the Witch and the Soccer Spell, 978-3-401-04569-6
- 10: Lilli the Witch and the Mysterious Mummy, 978-3-401-04935-9
- 11: Lilli the Witch and the Secret of the Sunken World, 978-3-401-05063-8
- 12: Lilli the Witch and the Magic Sword, 978-3-401-05265-6
- 13: Lilli the Witch at Dracula's Castle, 978-3-401-05312-7
- 14: Lilli the Witch – Hunt for the Lost Treasure, 978-3-401-05550-3
- 15: Lilli the Witch and the Knight Travel Through Time, 978-3-401-05951-8
- 16: Lilli the Witch and the Nervous Viking, 978-3-401-05371-3
- 17: Lilli the Witch in the Land of the Dinosaurs, 978-3-401-06058-3
- 18: Lilli the Witch Flies to the Moon, 978-3-401-06141-2
- 19: Lilli the Witch – The Dragon and the Magic Book, 978-3-401-06142-9
- Lilli the Witch: The Dragon and the Magic Book. The book accompanying the film, 978-3-401-06288-4
- 20: Lilli the Witch in Lilliput, 978-3-401-06355-3
- 21: Lilli the Witch and Hector's Tricky Dragon Test, 978-3-401-06371-3

=== First Readers ===
- 1: Lilli the Witch and the Magic Homework, 978-3-401-07421-4
- 2: Lilli the Witch Throws a Birthday Party, 978-3-401-07544-0
- 3: Lilli the Witch and the Vampire with the Loose Tooth, 978-3-401-08185-4
- 4: Lilli the Witch and the Nutty Knight, 978-3-401-08647-7
- 5: Lilli the Witch and the Wild Dinosaurs, 978-3-401-08791-7
- 6: Lilli the Witch and the Bewitched Soccer Game, 978-3-401-08900-3
- 7: Lilli the Witch Discovers America, 978-3-401-08999-7
- 8: Lilli the Witch and the Blasted Ghost Magic, 978-3-401-09170-7
- 9: Lilli the Witch and the Bathtub Pirate, 978-3-401-09368-0
- 10: Lilli the Witch and Little Polar Bear Nubby, 978-3-401-09474-8

=== Learning Languages ===
- 1: Let's read English – Lilli the Witch – Magic Homework, 978-3-401-08790-0
- 2: Let's read English – Lilli the Witch and the Wild Dinosaurs, 978-3-401-08949-2
- 3: Let's read English – Lilli the Witch Throws a Birthday Party, 978-3-401-09226-3
- 1: Lilli the Witch – Trouble at School, 978-3-401-02850-7
- 2: Lilli the Witch at Vampire Castle, 978-3-401-02425-7
- 1: Cadı Lilli İle Vahşi Dinozorlar/Lilli the Witch and the Wild Dinosaurs, 978-3-401-02426-4 (Bilingual School Edition)

=== Non-Fiction ===
- 1: Lilli the Witch's Expertise – Dinosaurs, 978-3-401-09058-0
- 2: Lilli the Witch's Expertise – Pirates, 978-3-401-09059-7
- 3: Lilli the Witch's Expertise – Old Egypt, 978-3-401-09104-4
- 4: Lilli the Witch's Expertise – The Knight's Castle, 978-3-401-09218-8
- 5: Lilli the Witch's Expertise – Horses, 978-3-401-09260-7
- 6: Lilli the Witch's Expertise – Whales and Dolphins, 978-3-401-09387-1
- 7: Lilli the Witch's Expertise – Stars and Planets, 978-3-401-09421-2

=== Learn&Play ===
- 1: Bingo Training Book – Lilli the Witch and the Nutty Knight, 978-3-401-41349-5
- 2: Bingo Training Book – Lilli the Witch Throws a Birthday Party, 978-3-401-41369-3
- 3: Bingo Training Book – Lilli the Witch and the Wild Dinos, 978-3-401-41404-1
- 4: Bingo Training Book – Lilli the Witch and the Vampire with the Loose Tooth, 978-3-401-41407-2
- 5: Bingo Training Book – Lilli the Witch and the Bewitched Soccer Game, 978-3-401-41437-9
- 6: Bingo Training Book – Lilli the Witch Discovers America, 978-3-401-41452-2
- 1: Lilli the Witch-Quiz – Can Fish Drink Water?, 978-3-401-09371-0
- 2: Lilli the Witch-Quiz – Are Chick Peas Some Kind of Chicken?, 978-3-401-09372-7
- 3: Lilli the Witch-Quiz – Why Do Fireflies Glow in the Dark?, 978-3-401-09441-0
- 4: Lilli the Witch-Quiz – Can Birds Fly Backwards?, 978-3-401-09571-2
- 1: Lilli the Witch Number Puzzle – Plus and Minus up to 20, 978-3-401-41409-6
- 2: Lilli the Witch Number Puzzle – Plus and Minus up to 100, 978-3-401-41410-2
- 3: Lilli the Witch Number Puzzle – Multiply and Divide up to 100, 978-3-401-41430-0
- 4: Lilli the Witch Alphabet Puzzle, 978-3-401-41445-4

=== Miscellaneous ===
- 1: Lilli the Witch Friendship Book, 978-3-401-05690-6
- 2: Lilli the Witch Note Book, 978-3-401-05913-6
- 3: Lilli the Witch Homework Book, 978-3-401-05959-4
- 4: Lilli the Witch: The Dragon and the Magic Book. Homework Book, 978-3-401-06450-5
- 5: Lilli the Witch Diary, 978-3-401-05711-8
- 6: Lilli the Witch Photo Album, 978-3-401-05960-0
- 7: Lilli the Witch Postcard Box, 978-3-401-05824-5
- 8: Lilli the Witch My School Friends (blue), 978-3-401-06207-5
- 9: Lilli the Witch My School Friends (pink), 978-3-401-05633-3
- 10: Lilli the Witch and the Pirates (special edition), 978-3-401-06298-3
- 11: Lilli the Witch and the Secret of the Sunken World (special edition), 978-3-401-06106-1
- 12: Lilli the Witch and the Knight on Time Travel (special edition), 978-3-401-06300-3
- 13: Lilli the Witch Expert Book, 978-3-401-06105-4
- 14: Lilli the Witch School Calendar, 978-3-401-06250-1
- 15: Party Fun with Lilli the Witch, 978-3-401-02442-6
- 16: The Favourite Jokes of Lilli the Witch, 978-3-401-50132-2
- 17: The Funniest Students' Rhymes of Lilli the Witch, 978-3-401-50133-2
- 18: Lilli the Witch's Secret School of Magic, 978-3-401-05500-8
- 19: Christmas-Time – Bewitched Times with Lilli the Witch, 978-3-401-04770-6
- 20: Lilli the Witch computer game – Adventure in the Royal Palace, 978-3-401-06050-7

=== TV Series ===
- 1: Magic Riddles – In the Knight's Castle, 978-3-401-45351-4
- 2: Magic Riddles – In the Haunted Castle, 978-3-401-45352-1
- 3: Magic Riddles – Animal World, 978-3-401-45353-8
- 4: Magic Riddles – Adventurous Journey, 978-3-401-45354-5
- 5: Magic Riddles – The Super Detective, 978-3-401-45361-3
- 6: Magic Riddles – In the Fairy Castle, 978-3-401-45362-0
- 1: Colouring Book – Lilli and the Dinosaurs, 978-3-401-08855-6
- 2: Colouring Book – Lilli and the Vikings, 978-3-401-08856-3
- 3: Colouring Book – Lilli and Robin Hood, 978-3-401-08857-0
- 4: Colouring Book – Lilli and the Aztecs, 978-3-401-08858-7
- 1: Magic Drawing Fun – The Gold Treasure, 978-3-401-45355-2
- 2: Magic Drawing Fun – In the Fairy World, 978-3-401-45356-9
- 3: Magic Drawing Fun – In the Stone Age, 978-3-401-45357-6
- 4: Magic Drawing Fun – At the Magic School, 978-3-401-45358-3
- 5: Magic Drawing Fun – In Elves' Realm, 978-3-401-45363-7
- 6: Magic Drawing Fun – And the Pirates, 978-3-401-45364-4
- 1: For First Readers – In Dragon Land, 978-3-401-45347-7 (by Annett Stütze)
- 2: For First Readers –The Journey to the Fairies, 978-3-401-45348-4 (by Annett Stütze)
- 3: For First Readers –The Mysterious Pirate Island, 978-3-401-45349-1 (by Annett Stütze)
- 4: For First Readers – The Land of Magic Secrets, 978-3-401-45350-7 (by Annett Stütze)
- 5: For First Readers – The Secret of the Dinosaurs, 978-3-401-45359-0 (by Annett Stütze)
- 6: For First Readers – The Strong Knights, 978-3-401-45360-6 (by Annett Stütze)
