= Alan D'Angerio =

American hairstylist

- Occupation: Hairstylist
- Years active: 1978–2022

Alan D'Angerio is an American hairstylist. He was nominated for an Academy Award in the category Best Makeup and Hairstyling for the film Philadelphia.

In addition to his Academy Award, he was nominated for a Primetime Emmy Award in the category Outstanding Hairstyling For A Miniseries, Movie Or A Special for his work on the television film Their Eyes Were Watching God. His nomination was shared with Barbara Lorenz.

== Selected filmography ==
- The Cotton Club (1984) – hair department head
- Philadelphia (1993; co-nominated with Carl Fullerton) – hair style designer
- Born Yesterday (1993 film) – hair department head
- Wolf (1994 film) – hair department head
- The Producers (2005 film) – hair department head
- Their Eyes Were Watching God (2005; nominated for Emmy) – hair department head
- The Good Shepherd (2006) – hair department head
- The Girl in the Park (2007) – hair department head
- The Odd Life of Timothy Green (2012) – hair department head
- This is Where I Leave You (2014) – hair department head
- Run All Night (film) (2015) – hair department head
- Falling Water (TV series) (2016) – hair department head
- Ocean's Eight (2018) – hair department head
