= Pirates of the Caribbean: The Curse of the Black Pearl (soundtrack) =

Film score by Klaus Badelt and Hans Zimmer
- Released: July 22, 2003
- Genre: Orchestral
- Length: 43:50
- Label: Walt Disney
- Producer: Klaus Badelt

Klaus Badelt chronology
| The In-Laws (2003) | Pirates of the Caribbean: The Curse of the Black Pearl (2003) | Beat the Drum (2003) |

Hans Zimmer chronology
| Tears of the Sun (2003) | Pirates of the Caribbean: The Curse of the Black Pearl (2003) | Matchstick Men (2003) |

Pirates of the Caribbean chronology
| Walt Disney's Pirates of the Caribbean (1966) | The Curse of the Black Pearl (2003) | Pirates Remixed (2006) |

Professional ratings
Review scores
| Source | Rating |
|---|---|
| AllMusic | 2/5 stars |
| Empire | 2/5 stars |
| Filmtracks | 1/5 stars |
| Movie Music UK | 4/5 stars |
| Movie Wave | 3/5 stars |
| SoundtrackNet | 3.5/5 stars |

Pirates of the Caribbean: The Curse of the Black Pearl is the official soundtrack album from the film of the same name. The album was released on July 22, 2003, by Walt Disney Records, and contains selections of music from the film score. The music of the film and this album are credited to composer Klaus Badelt and producer Hans Zimmer.

== Track listing ==
| No. | Title | Length | Key Scenes/Notes |
|---|---|---|---|
| 1 | Fog Bound | 2:16 | The track begins with a light cello jig before descending into a plodding, suspenseful theme (00:28) that incorporates woodwinds later used to denote the Black Pearl and its cursed crew. The theme reaches a suspenseful climax (approx 01:30) before leading into the film's love theme that continues until the end of the track, segueing directly into "The Medallion Calls". |
| 2 | The Medallion Calls | 1:53 | The track begins as a segue from "Fog Bound", continuing the film's love theme. This gives way to Jack Sparrow's introductory theme (00:16), which is repeated throughout the film series as the character's leitmotif. It dips into a mournful tune (00:57) before rising heroically (01:06) and ending the track with a waltzing melody. |
| 3 | The Black Pearl | 2:16 | The cue starts with a sinister tune and then transfers into an exciting score with notable horns playing. Despite its title, the cue underscores Jack Sparrow's escape from James Norrington's marines in Port Royal. The main theme appears elsewhere in the score, notably during "Will and Elizabeth". |
| 4 | Will and Elizabeth | 2:08 | The track segues in from "The Black Pearl" with a dramatic note, before rising into the film's main "swashbuckling" theme (00:05). This continues at a fast pace, building until the climax (02:04), where it drops off into "Swords Crossed". Despite the name, this track underscores the duel between Jack Sparrow and William Turner in the Blacksmith shop. |
| 5 | Swords Crossed | 3:16 | This track plays during Elizabeth's dinner with Barbossa, when she discovers the cursed pirates for the first time. |
| 6 | Walk the Plank | 1:59 | This track opens with a segue from "Swords Crossed", then it transitions to Jack and Will preparing to commandeer Interceptor. |
| 7 | Barbossa Is Hungry | 4:06 | This track is used as the action cue for the chase between HMS Interceptor and Black Pearl. |
| 8 | Blood Ritual | 3:33 | The first part is played when Pintel & Ragetti reveal Bootstrap's story, while the track's latter part is played as Jack Sparrow and William Turner commandeer Interceptor from Port Royal. |
| 9 | Moonlight Serenade | 2:09 | The beginning is played when Jack and Elizabeth are marooned. The track ends with an action piece, highlighting the very beginning of the climactic battle. |
| 10 | To the Pirates' Cave! | 3:31 | This track is played when Elizabeth rescues the crew of the Black Pearl in the climactic battles of the film, and earlier in the film during Will and Elizabeth's conversation aboard the Interceptor. |
| 11 | Skull and Crossbones | 3:24 | The cue is played during the duel between Jack Sparrow and Hector Barbossa, and the aftermath of the destruction of Interceptor. The action part of this track sounds rather different in the film. |
| 12 | Bootstrap's Bootstraps | 2:39 | The track opens with a menacing version of the cursed crew theme, which leads to the main theme heard in "He's a Pirate." Despite its name, taken from Pintel's line concerning William "Bootstrap Bill" Turner being tied to a cannon by his bootstraps, this cue is played during the battle of the Isla de Muerta between the Commodore Norrington and his soldiers of the Royal Navy against the Cursed crew, and the duel between Jack Sparrow and Hector Barbossa. |
| 13 | Underwater March | 4:12 | The beginning of the track plays when the curse is lifted and the pirates are beaten, and the end plays during their underwater march. |
| 14 | One Last Shot | 4:46 | This track is played in the final scenes of the film. |
| 15 | He's a Pirate | 1:30 | This track is played at the beginning of the credits. It opens with the score's main action theme, then continues into the swashbuckling theme established in "The Black Pearl" (0:45). It closes with a threatening tremolo (1:13). |

== Production ==
Composer Alan Silvestri was originally hired to write the score for The Curse of the Black Pearl, having collaborated with director Gore Verbinski on Mouse Hunt and The Mexican. However, due to creative differences between the producer Jerry Bruckheimer and him, Silvestri left the project before recording any material. Verbinski and Bruckheimer decided to go with Hans Zimmer's team instead, who were frequent collaborators of their productions. Verbinski asked Hans Zimmer, with whom he had worked on The Ring, to step in. Zimmer declined to do the bulk of the composing, as he was busy scoring The Last Samurai, a project during which he claimed he had promised not to take any other assignments. As a result, he referred Verbinski to Klaus Badelt, a relatively new composer who had been a part of Remote Control Productions (known as Media Ventures at the time) for three years. At that point, Badelt had only composed a few films, including The Time Machine, The Recruit, K-19: The Widowmaker and Basic.

Zimmer however ended up collaborating with Badelt to write most of the score's primary themes. Zimmer said he wrote most of the music in the space of one night, and then recorded them in an all-synthesized demo credited to him. This demo presents three of the score's themes and motifs, concluding with an early version of "He's A Pirate" which differs from the final cue and includes a development of a melody Zimmer wrote for the score to Drop Zone. Since the schedule was very tight and the music was needed for the film in three weeks, seven other composers — Ramin Djawadi, James Dooley, Nick Glennie-Smith, Steve Jablonsky, Blake Neely, James McKee Smith, and Geoff Zanelli — were called upon to help orchestrate the music and write additional cues. The resulting score was recorded with a group of musicians, credited as the Hollywood Studio Symphony, over the course of four days. The short time frame demanded the use of a different recording studio for each session. The Metro Voices, a male choir, was recorded in London and added to the finished recordings.

The soundtrack album, consisting of 43 minutes of the film's score, was released with Klaus Badelt credited as the composer. The cues were edited for length, and minor changes to the mix were also made. For unknown reasons, the mixing of several cues are executed with gain levels so high that it causes distortion. This is noticeable particularly during the action cues and the reprise of the love theme in track 14, "One Last Shot". It is also noted that besides the first cue, the tracks' generic names were unrelated to their contents. According to the official website of composer Geoff Zanelli, this was because the production "schedule was so short that [they] had to decide on the track names for the album packaging before the score was even written!"

Badelt was credited as the conductor on early batches of the disc, but it was actually conducted by Blake Neely.

== Orchestration ==
For the most part, The Curse of the Black Pearl features simple orchestration. Counterpoint is rare; most of the louder music consists of melody, simple harmony, and rhythmic figures in the low brass and low strings. Sampled drum beats including tom-toms and various cymbals are used ubiquitously in such sections. A very low, rumbling bass line was also introduced into the mix to reinforce the cello and double basses. Quieter sections tend to rely either on the string section or on sound effects. Pan flute, possibly synthesized or sampled, and claves can be heard repeatedly in the eerier cues.

One of the defining characteristics of this score's sound is the use of horn for melody. Nearly all of the score's louder sections feature the horns on the melody, frequently doubled by various string instruments.

== Kingdom Hearts II ==
For the video game Kingdom Hearts II, which features a number of scenes based on the movie, composer Yoko Shimomura arranged a synthesized "He's a Pirate" to serve as the musical theme for all combat in the Port Royal world. This arrangement is identical in structure to the original cue, though a number of changes were made to the melody and chords.

== Reception ==
The score received mixed reviews from critics. Christian Clemmensen of Filmtracks.com gave it one out of a possible five stars, criticizing its similarities to past Remote Control scores such as The Rock and Gladiator. He also criticized its lack of connections to the "swashbuckling" genre, stating, "The most disgraceful part of the pounding and shouting score for The Curse of the Black Pearl is that there is really nothing swashbuckling about it. If you remove the tepid little thirty-second jig from the start of the opening cue, then this score could easily accompany a movie about alien attacks, police force raids, chases for nuclear weapons, or any other militaristic setting."

Andrew Granade of Soundtrack.net gave the score a mostly positive review, giving it a 3.5 out of 5 rating and stating, "Pirates of the Caribbean is over the top in both movie and score, yet in a good-natured way. Badelt's work here is pleasing without being too heavy and is fully melded with the onscreen action."

== Certifications ==
| Region | Certification | Certified units/sales |
|---|---|---|
| United Kingdom (BPI) | Silver | 60,000^{‡} |
| United States (RIAA) | Gold | 500,000^{^} |
^{^} Shipments figures based on certification alone.^{‡} Sales+streaming figures based on certification alone.
