= The Time Machine (soundtrack) =

The Time Machine: Original Motion Picture Soundtrack

Film score by Klaus Badelt
- Released: March 19, 2002
- Recorded: AIR (London); Abbey Road (London)
- Length: 55:18
- Label: Varèse Sarabande

Professional ratings
Review scores
Source	Rating
AllMusic	2.5/5 stars

The Time Machine is the original motion picture soundtrack of the film of the same name, both released in 2002. It was composed by Klaus Badelt. A promotional edition contains more cues and alternate versions of some cues.

== Track listing ==
All music is composed by Klaus Badelt.

No.	Title	Length
1.	"Professor Alexander Hartdegen"	1:25
2.	"Wish Me Luck"	1:21
3.	"Emma"	2:35
4.	"The Time Machine"	3:11
5.	"Bleeker Street"	2:26
6.	"I Don't Belong Here"	3:48
7.	"Time Travel"	4:36
8.	"Eloi"	2:10
9.	"Good Night"	4:03
10.	"Stone Language"	4:53
11.	"Morlocks Attack"	4:23
12.	"Where the Ghosts Are"	1:36
13.	"The Master"	7:15
14.	""What If?""	6:16
15.	"Godspeed"	5:20
Total length:		55:18

== Usage in other media ==
- A sample of "Morlocks Attack" was used in the trailer for the 2003 film, The League of Extraordinary Gentlemen.
