= Lilly the Witch: The Dragon and the Magic Book =

- Theatrical release poster
- Directed by: Stefan Ruzowitzky
- Written by: Stefan Ruzowitzky; Armin Toerkell; Ralph Martin
- Based on: Lilli the Witch by Knister
- Starring: Alina Freund; Michael Mittermeier; Pilar Bardem; Anja Kling; Ingo Naujoks; Sami Herzog
- Cinematography: Peter von Haller
- Edited by: Britta Nahler
- Music by: Ian Honeyman
- Production companies: blue eyes Fiction; Trixter; Dor Film; Steinweg Emotion Pictures; Classic; Buena Vista International Film Production (Germany); Babelsberg Film
- Distributed by: Walt Disney Studios Motion Pictures (Note: Distributed under the Walt Disney Pictures banner, while Buena Vista International distributed under this banner for international releases, alongside Telepool.)
- Release dates: 19 February 2009 (Germany and Austria); 12 June 2009 (Spain)
- Running time: 89 minutes
- Countries: Germany; Austria; Spain
- Language: German
- Budget: $11.7 million
- Box office: $16.2 million

Lilly the Witch: The Dragon and the Magic Book (German: Hexe Lilli: Der Drache und das magische Buch) is a 2009 German-language children's film directed by Stefan Ruzowitzky. It is a partly animated comic fantasy based on the books by Knister, who co-wrote the screenplay.

The film was released on 19 February 2009 by Walt Disney Studios Motion Pictures Germany under the Walt Disney Pictures banner. A sequel, Lilly the Witch: The Journey to Mandolan, was released in 2011.

It was nominated for the Deutscher Filmpreis (German Film Award) in the category "Best Children's Film".

== Plot ==
The old witch Surulunda orders little clumsy dragon Hector to find a successor for her. Bringing along a magical book, Hector flies into the room of the young girl Lilly. She agrees to be the new witch, and has to prove her fitness for the job during a probationary period of 99 hours. She has to deal with evil warlock Jerome and his Pug minion who wants to steal the book, which he wants to use to take over the world. For this purpose he tricks people into looking into his eyes, so that he can hypnotize them. The victims, including Lilly's mother, start to behave oddly and dress in grey.

Lilly and her little brother Leon often quarrel, but when Jerome kidnaps Leon and demands the book for his release, Lilly gives up the book temporarily. The two, together with two boys from school, succeed in recapturing it, thus saving the world from Jerome's control. This also improves Lilly's relationship with Leon.

== Cast ==
- Pilar Bardem as Surulunda
- Michael Mittermeier as Hector (voice)
- Alina Freund as Lilly
- Ingo Naujoks as Jerome (Hieronymus)
- Sami Herzog as Leon
- Anja Kling as Mother

== See also ==
- Lilly the Witch, the television series
- List of films about witchcraft
