= Cured (film) =

2020 American documentary film

- Film poster
- Directed by: Bennett Singer; Patrick Sammon
- Written by: Bennett Singer; Patrick Sammon
- Produced by: Bennett Singer; Patrick Sammon
- Cinematography: Sam Henriques
- Edited by: Steve Heffner
- Music by: Ian Honeyman
- Production companies: Singer & Deschamps Productions; Story Center Films
- Release date: August 24, 2020 (Outfest)
- Running time: 82 minutes
- Country: United States
- Language: English

Cured is an American documentary film, directed by Bennett Singer and Patrick Sammon and released in 2020. The film depicts the inner workings of the campaign that led to homosexuality being delisted from the Diagnostic and Statistical Manual of Mental Disorders in 1973.

== Release ==
The film premiered on August 24, 2020, at Outfest. With the festival presented virtually due to the COVID-19 pandemic, it was subsequently named to the festival's "Encore Week", which presented followup rescreenings of selected films from the festival's official lineup. In November, it won the Audience Award for Best Documentary Feature at NewFest.

== Reception ==
=== Accolades ===
| Year | Award | Category | Recipient(s) | Result | Ref. |
|---|---|---|---|---|---|
| 2020 | Frameline San Francisco International LGBTQ Film Festival | Audience Award for Best Documentary | Cured | Won | |
| 2020 | Library of Congress Lavine/Ken Burns Prize for Film | Jury Award | Patrick Sammon; Bennett Singer; Story Center Films; Singer & Deschamps Productions | Nominated | |
| 2020 | NewFest: New York LGBT Film Festival | Audience Award for Best Documentary Feature | Cured | Won | |
| 2020 | OUT at the Movies International LGBT Film Fest | Best Documentary Feature | Cured | Won | |
| 2020 | ImageOut: The Rochester LGBT Film Festival | Audience Award for Best Documentary Feature | Cured | Won | |
| 2021 | American Historical Association | John E. O’Connor Film Award | Cured | Won | |
| 2021 | Cleveland International Film Festival | Greg Gund Memorial Standing Up Award | Patrick Sammon and Bennett Singer | Nominated | |
| 2021 | Hollywood Music in Media Awards | Best Original Song in a Documentary | "The Other Side of the Rainbow". Written and performed by Ian Honeyman and Tucker Murray Caploe | Nominated | |
| 2021 | Merlinka Festival | Best Documentary | Patrick Sammon and Bennett Singer | Nominated | |
| 2022 | International Documentary Association | Video Source Award | Patrick Sammon and Bennett Singer | Nominated | |
| 2022 | GLAAD Media Awards | Outstanding Documentary | Cured | Nominated | |
