= Clay Duncan =

American composer

Clay Duncan is an American music composer and synthesist for film, television and video games. He has contributed music to dozens of films including Michael Clayton, Iron Man and Transformers as well as TV shows Blade: The Series and The Grid.

Originally from Mississippi, he attended school at the University of Miami before relocating to Los Angeles, California.

Duncan is a member of Hans Zimmer's Remote Control Productions but has also worked with Harry Gregson Williams, Danny Elfman, James Newton Howard, Steve Jablonsky, Chris Beck, and Ramin Djawadi.
