= John M. Elliott Jr. =

- Occupation: makeup artist
- Years active: 1970–present

John M. Elliott Jr. is a makeup artist who was nominated at the 75th Academy Awards for Best Makeup. He was nominated for The Time Machine, his nomination was shared with Barbara Lorenz.

He has over 65 film and television credits since his start in 1970.
