= Remote Control Productions (American company) =

American film score company

Remote Control Productions, Inc.
- Formerly: Media Ventures Entertainment Group (1989-2003)
- Type: Private
- Industry: Music
- Founded: March 29, 1989; 37 years ago
- Founders: Jay Rifkin; Hans Zimmer
- Headquarters: Santa Monica, California, United States
- Key people: Hans Zimmer
- Owner: Hans Zimmer; Because Music; Extreme Music

Remote Control Productions, Inc. is a film score company run by composer Hans Zimmer and based in Santa Monica, California. Originally known as Media Ventures Entertainment Group, which was conceived and founded by Zimmer and Jay Rifkin, the company changed its name after the partners both filed lawsuits against each other.

Remote Control Productions has been responsible for the scores for a number of successful live-action films including the Pirates of the Caribbean movies, Iron Man, Gladiator, Mission: Impossible 2, The Last Samurai, Transformers, Hancock, Kingdom of Heaven, The Da Vinci Code, Inception, Michael Clayton, Sherlock Holmes and its sequel, and The Dark Knight Trilogy, along with animated films such as the Shrek series, Kung Fu Panda, Madagascar, The Lion King, Raya and the Last Dragon, and more. Many composers from Remote Control Productions have also worked on the scores of successful video games such as the Metal Gear and Skylanders series, The Sims 3, Gears of War 2, Call of Duty: Modern Warfare, its sequel, Call of Duty: Modern Warfare 2, Crysis 2, Assassin's Creed: Revelations, and Assassin's Creed III. Harry Gregson-Williams was the first Media Ventures composer to work in the video game industry on Metal Gear Solid 2: Sons of Liberty in 2001. Klaus Badelt, Stephen Barton, Steve Jablonsky, Lorne Balfe, and Hans Zimmer joined a few years later.

== Composers ==
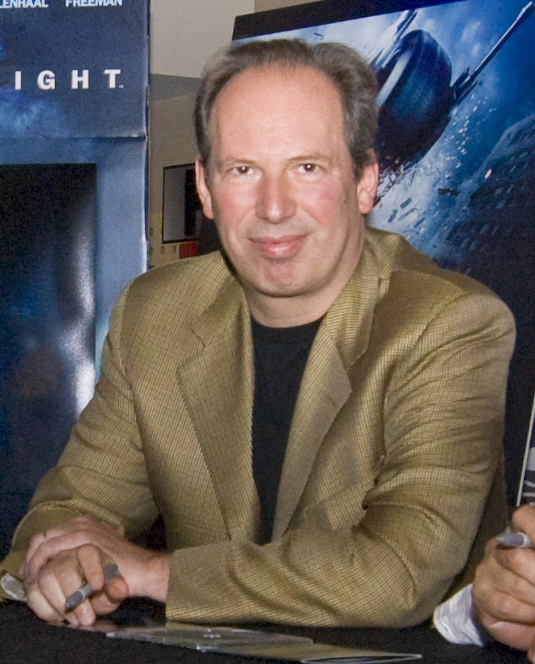
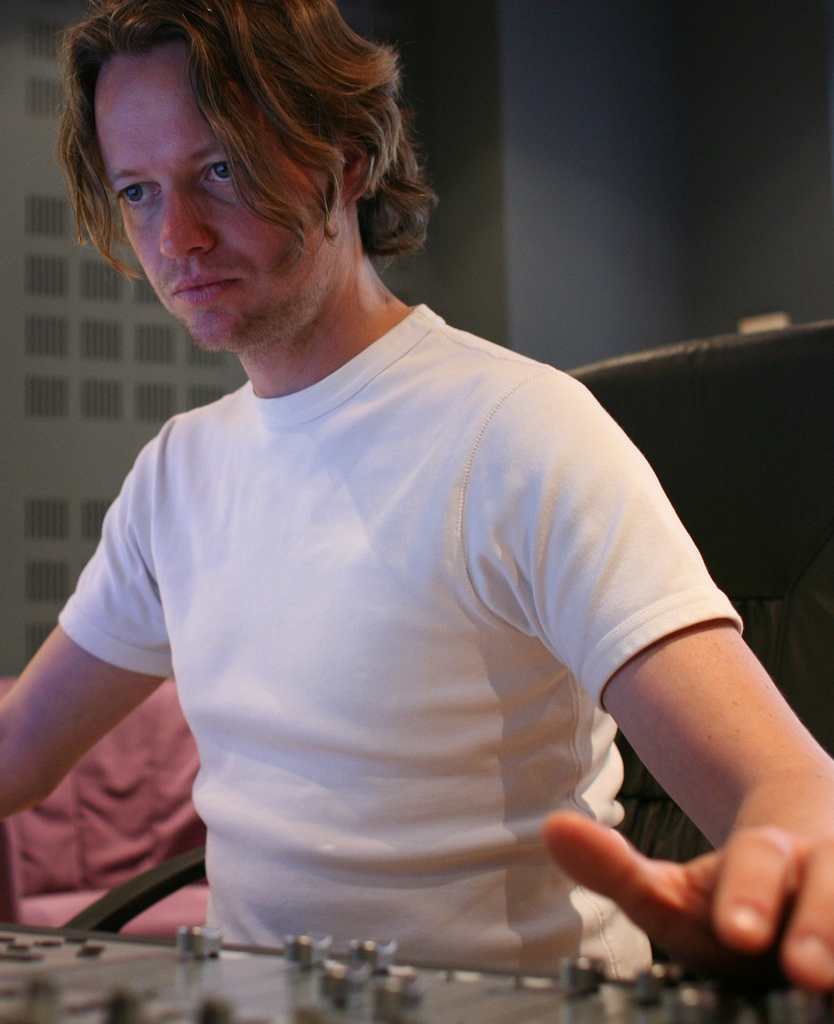
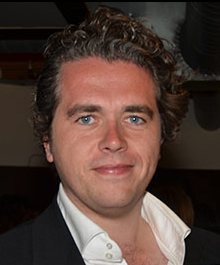
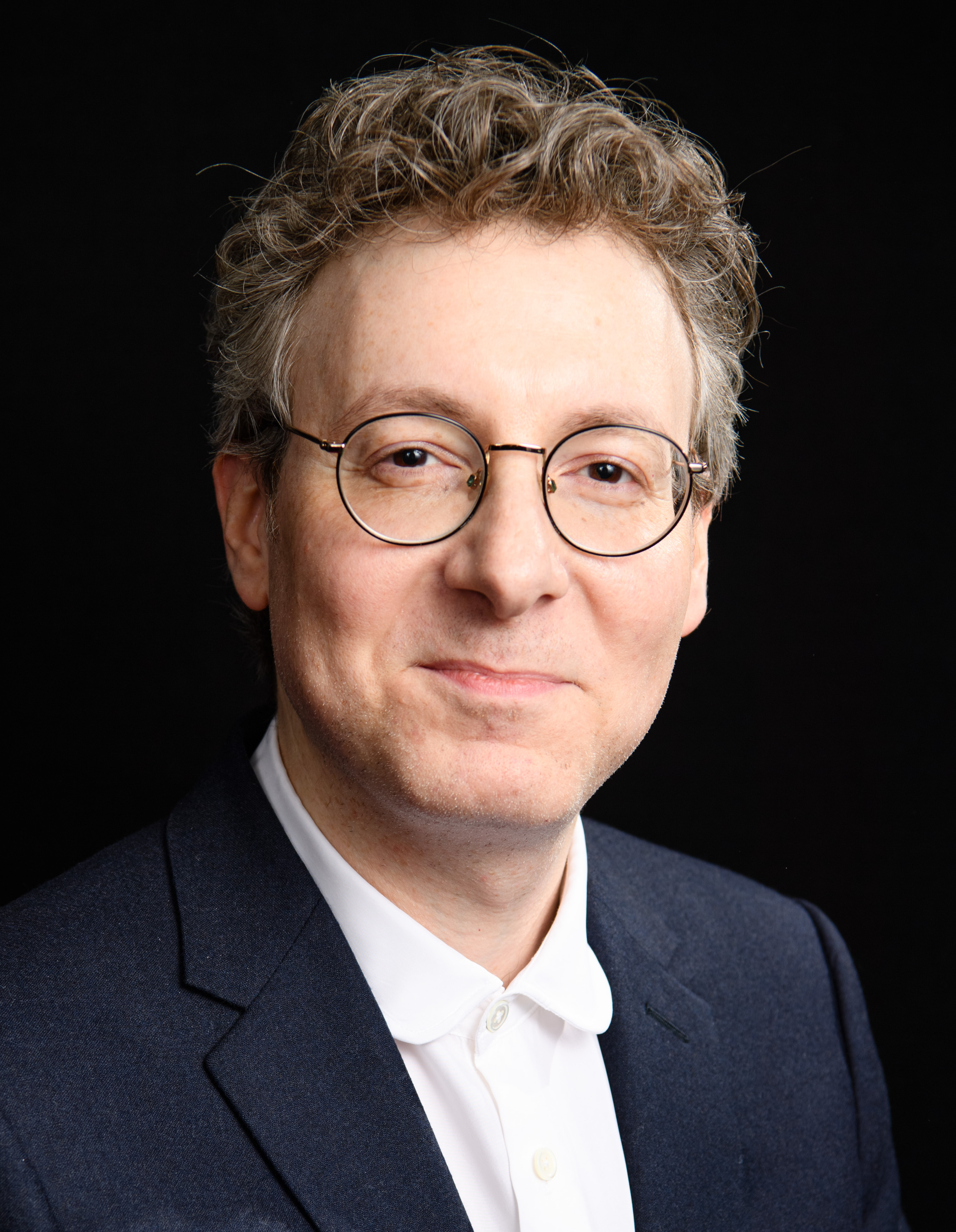
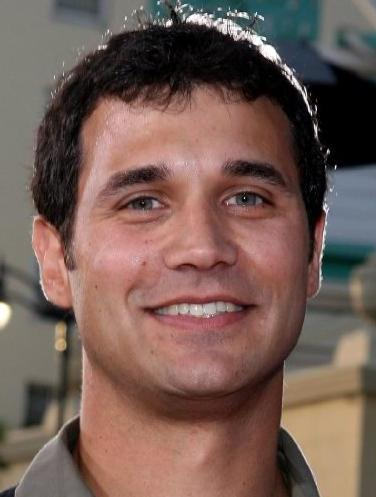
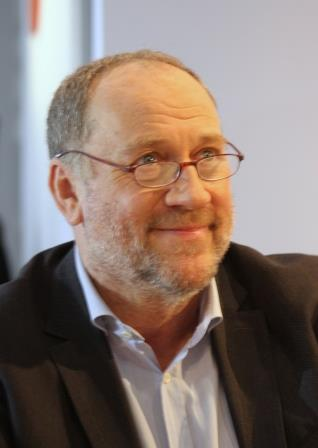
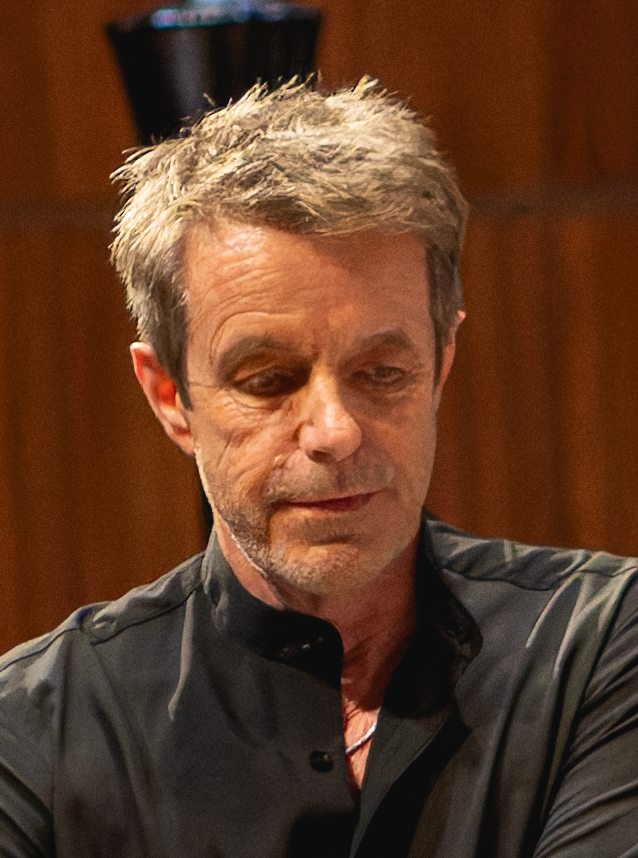
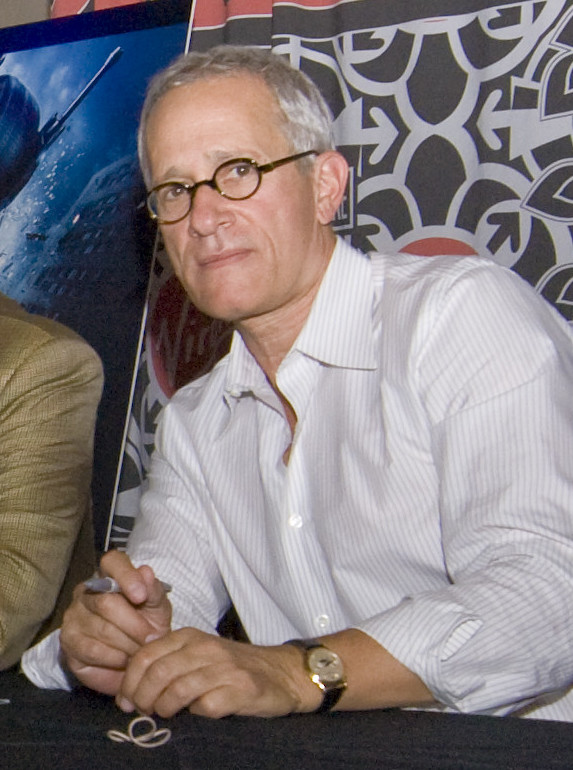
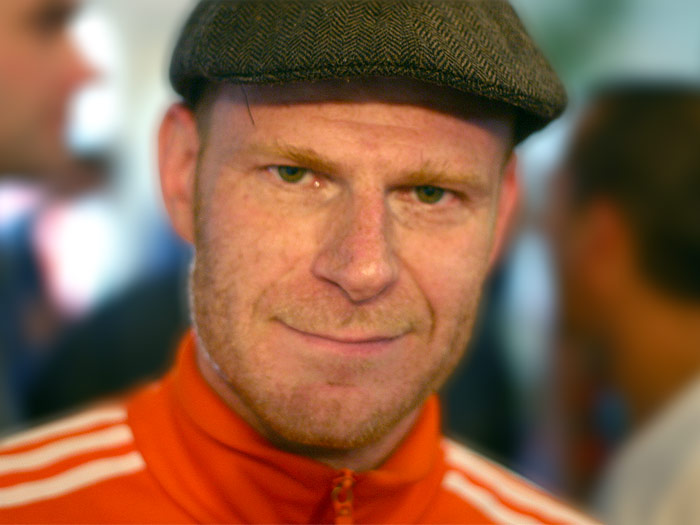
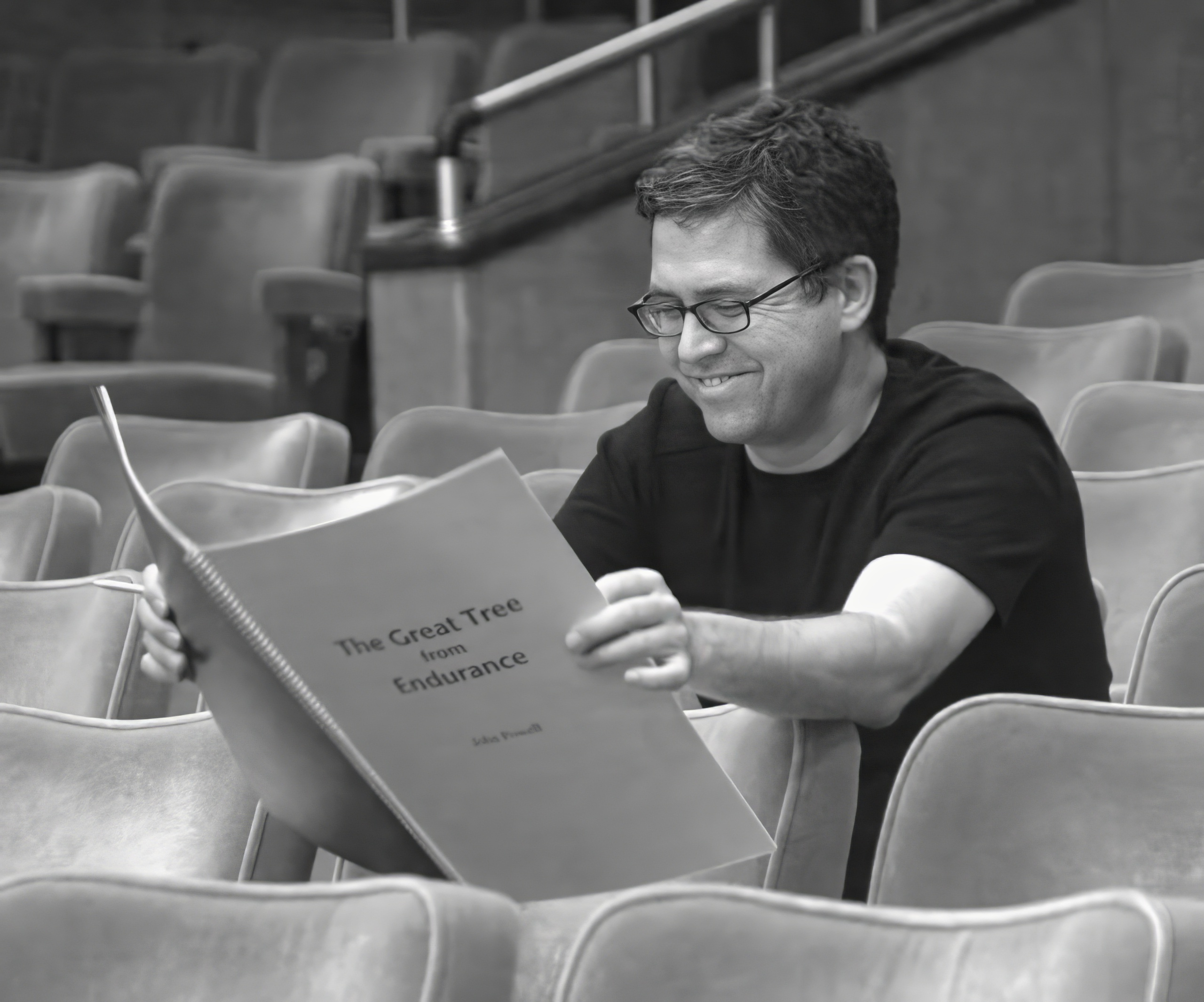
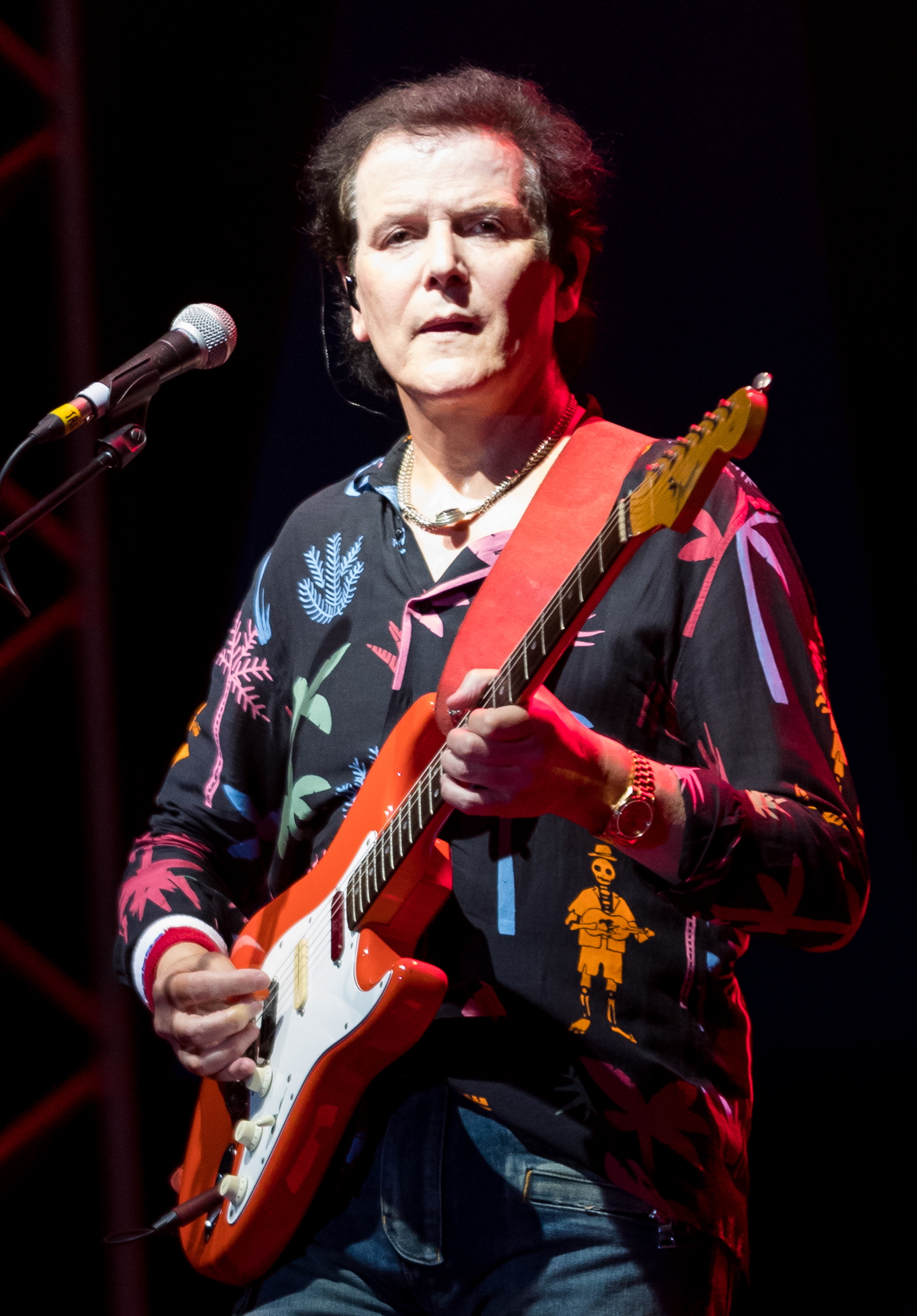
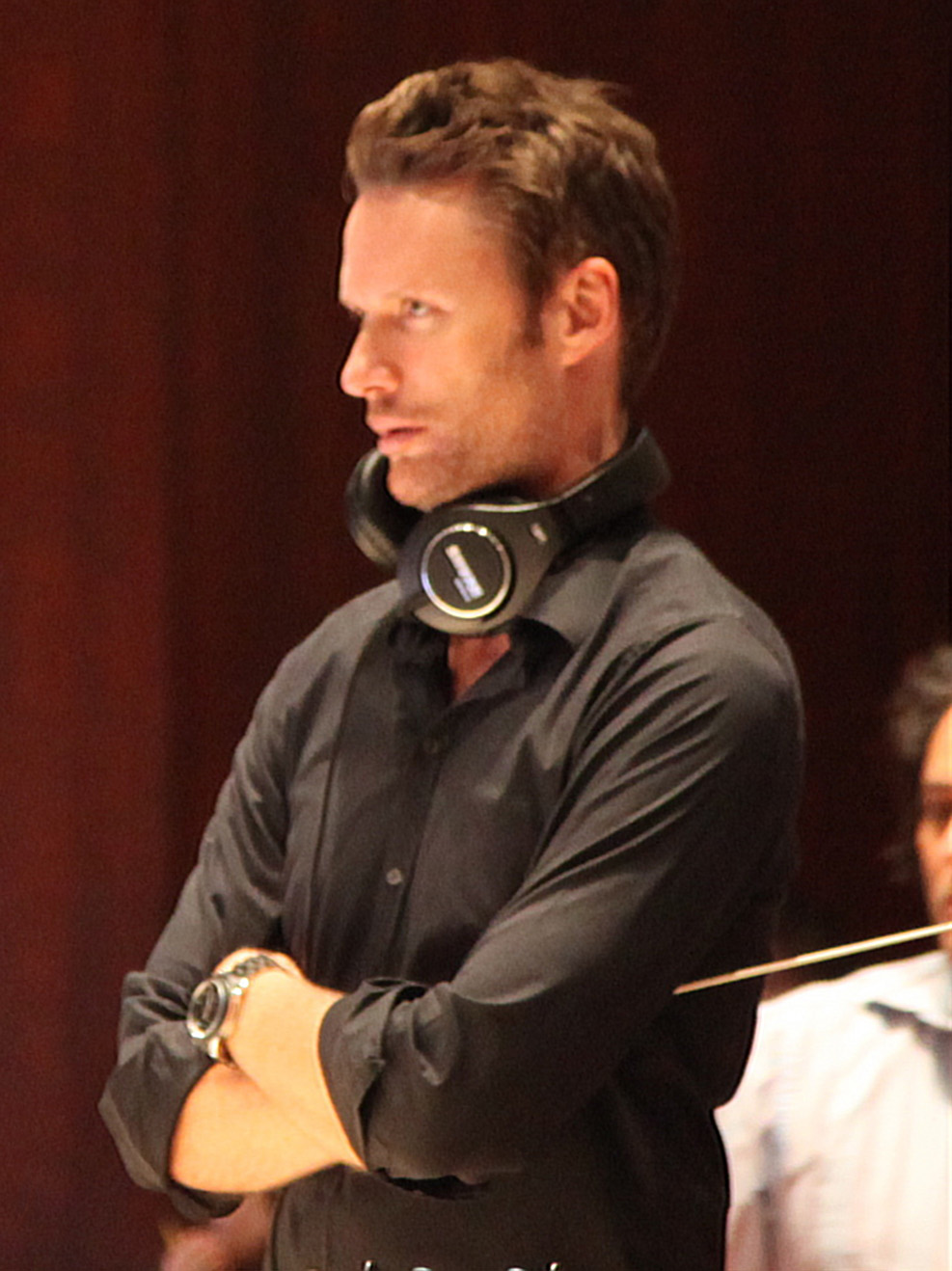
Some of the most notable composers working at Remote Control Productions besides Hans Zimmer, including Klaus Badelt, Lorne Balfe, Nicholas Britell, Ramin Djawadi, Harold Faltermeyer, Harry Gregson-Williams, James Newton Howard, Tom Holkenborg, John Powell, Trevor Rabin and Brian Tyler.

Composers who are working or have worked with Hans Zimmer at Remote Control Productions include:

- (United States) Ryeland Allison
- (United States) Max Aruj
- (United States) Chris Bacon
- (Germany) Klaus Badelt
- (United Kingdom) Lorne Balfe
- (United Kingdom) Stephen Barton
- (United States) Tyler Bates
- (Norway) Thomas Bergersen
- (United States) Jongnic Bontemps
- (United States) Lauren Bousfield
- (United States) Nicholas Britell
- (Canada) Michael Brook
- (United Kingdom) David Buckley
- (United States) Justin Burnett
- (United States) Toby Chu
- (United Kingdom) Phil Collins
- (Germany) Ramin Djawadi
- (United States) James Dooley
- (United States) Clay Duncan
- (United States) Stephanie Economou
- (United States) Mike Einziger
- (Venezuela) Pedro Eustache
- (Iran) Nima Fakhrara
- (Germany) Harold Faltermeyer
- (United States) David Fleming
- (Denmark) Troels Brun Folmann
- (United States) Germaine Franco
- (Australia) Lisa Gerrard
- (United States) Tom Gire
- (United Kingdom) Nick Glennie-Smith
- (United States) Alfie Godfrey
- (United Kingdom) Gavin Greenaway
- (United Kingdom) Harry Gregson-Williams
- (United Kingdom) Rupert Gregson-Williams
- (Turkey) Yunus Poyraz Guray
- (United States) PJ Hanke
- (United States) Don L. Harper
- (United Kingdom) Richard Harvey
- (United Kingdom) Pete Haycock
- (Israel) Ofra Haza
- (United States) Bart Hendrickson
- (Netherlands) Tom Holkenborg
- (United States) Ian Honeyman
- (United States) James Newton Howard
- (United Kingdom) Tom Howe
- (United States) Steve Jablonsky
- (United Kingdom) Henry Jackman
- (Australia) Bryce Jacobs
- (United Kingdom) Elton John
- (United States) Andrew Kawczynski
- (United Kingdom) Alastair King
- (Austria) Harald Kloser
- (United States) Alex Lacamoire
- (United States) James S. Levine
- (United States) Michael A. Levine
- (United Kingdom) Dominic Lewis
- (Germany) Henning Lohner
- (United States) Mark Mancina
- (United States) Matthew Margeson
- (United Kingdom) Johnny Marr
- (United States) Steve Mazzaro
- (United States) David Metzger
- (United States) Lin-Manuel Miranda
- (United States) Michael John Mollo
- (United States) Tom Morello
- (Canada) Trevor Morris
- (United Kingdom) Paul Mounsey
- (United States) Blake Neely
- (United Kingdom) Julian Nott
- (Iceland) Atli Örvarsson
- (Brazil) Heitor Pereira
- (United States) Nick Phoenix
- (United Kingdom) John Powell
- (United Kingdom) Graham Preskett
- (France) Daft Punk
- (South Africa) Trevor Rabin
- (New Zealand) Graeme Revell
- (United States) Kevin Riepl
- (United States) Jeff Rona
- (France) Guillaume Roussel
- (United States) Pieter Schlosser
- (Turkey) Batu Sener
- (United States) Michael Stevens
- (Italy) Diego Stocco
- (Germany) Marc Streitenfeld
- (Iran) Hangi Tavakoli
- (United Kingdom) Benson Taylor
- (Switzerland) Martin Tillman
- (United States) Stuart Michael Thomas
- (Germany) Steffen Thum
- (United States) John Van Tongeren
- (Turkey) Pinar Toprak
- (United States) Joseph Trapanese
- (United States) Brian Tyler
- (United States) Shirley Walker
- (United Kingdom) Benjamin Wallfisch
- (Germany) Matthias Weber
- (United States) James B. Weiss
- (United Kingdom) Mel Wesson
- (United States) Paul Westerberg
- (United States) Eric Whitacre
- (United States) Nathan Whitehead
- (United States) will.i.am
- (United States) Pharrell Williams
- (United States) Robb Williamson
- (United Kingdom) Anthony B. Willis
- (United Kingdom) Christopher Willis
- (United States) Geoff Zanelli

== Criticism ==
Christian Clemmensen of Filmtracks has noted Zimmer's use of ghostwriters. Other reviewers have also criticized Zimmer's approach to scoring films, as well as Remote Control Productions' dominance.
