= Klaus Badelt =

German composer (born 1967)

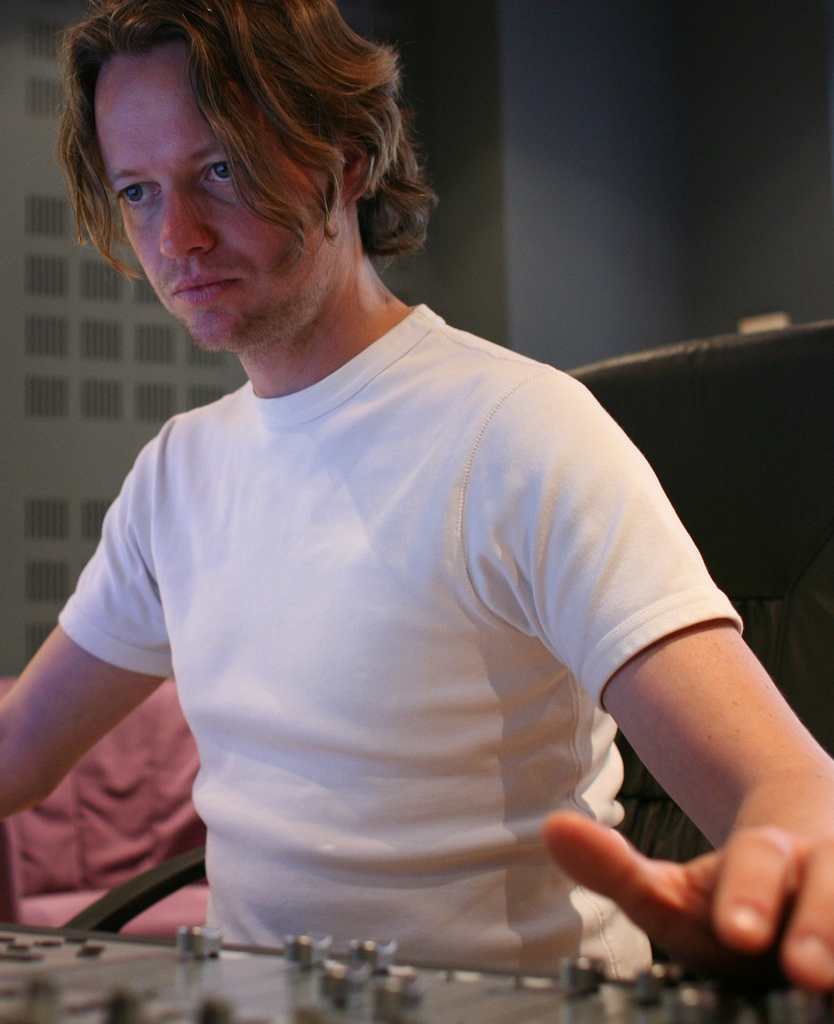
- Klaus Badelt, 2007

Background information
- Born: 12 June 1967 (age 59); Frankfurt, West Germany
- Origin: Frankfurt, Germany
- Genre: Film score
- Occupations: Composer; producer; arranger
- Years active: 1990s-present
- Website: klausbadelt.com

Klaus Badelt (born 12 June 1967) is a German composer, producer, and arranger of film scores. He is known for his collaborations with Hans Zimmer, helping to write scores for dozens of critically acclaimed films including The Thin Red Line, The Prince of Egypt, and Gladiator. Independently, he is known for his work on Hollywood blockbuster films such as Pirates of the Caribbean: The Curse of the Black Pearl, Equilibrium, Catwoman, K-19: The Widowmaker, Basic, and TMNT, and for his work in French and Chinese cinema as well as a number of films by Werner Herzog.

== Life and career ==
Badelt was born in Frankfurt, Germany. He started his musical career composing for movies and commercials in his homeland. In 1998, Oscar-winning film composer Hans Zimmer invited Badelt to work at Media Ventures in Santa Monica, California, his studio co-owned by Jay Rifkin. Since then, Badelt has been working on a number of his own film and television projects such as The Time Machine and K-19: The Widowmaker. He also collaborated with other Media Ventures composers, such as Harry Gregson-Williams, John Powell, and Zimmer; and mentored several others like Ramin Djawadi and Daniel Rojas.

While collaborating with Zimmer, Badelt contributed to the Oscar-nominated scores for The Thin Red Line and The Prince of Egypt, and wrote music for many well known directors and producers including Ridley Scott, Tony Scott, Terrence Malick, John Woo, Kathryn Bigelow, Jeffrey Katzenberg, Werner Herzog, Sean Penn, Gore Verbinski, Michael Bay and Steven Spielberg.

Badelt co-wrote and co-produced the score to Hollywood box office hit Gladiator, directed by Ridley Scott, along with Zimmer and singer/composer Lisa Gerrard. Having contributed music to Gladiator, Mission: Impossible 2 and Michael Kamen's score for X-Men, Badelt was involved in the three most successful movies in 2000. Badelt also collaborated with Zimmer on other successful films, such as The Pledge, and 2001 blockbusters Hannibal and Pearl Harbor. One of his more famous and popular scores was for the 2003 film Pirates of the Caribbean: The Curse of the Black Pearl.

In 2004, Badelt founded his own film music company, Theme Park Studios, in Santa Monica. Since then, he has scored films such as Constantine, Poseidon, Rescue Dawn, Premonition, and TMNT.

Among Badelt's most critically celebrated scores are the Chinese fantasy film The Promise and DreamWorks' remake of The Time Machine, the latter of which earned him the Discovery of the Year Award at the World Soundtrack Awards 2003. He also wrote the music for the closing ceremonies at the Beijing Olympics in 2008, and was commissioned to write an opera about China's First Emperor, premiered in 2015.

Badelt worked on the soundtrack for The Promise for almost six months. The song which can be heard in the movie's end credits is an ancient folk song in China, and very few people can still sing it. For that, Badelt traveled for almost two weeks in China to find someone who was able to sing the whole folk song in order to rearrange it for the score.

Badelt founded the digital film distribution startup Filmhub to create a platform for content creators to list their titles and get deals with global streaming services. Under the leadership of Badelt and CEO Alan d'Escragnolle, Filmhub now enables thousands of filmmakers to directly distribute to more than 100 streaming channels such as IMDb TV, Tubi, Amazon Prime Video, and Plex. In 2021, Filmhub was recognized by Variety as "a dynamic disruptor in the distribution space."

== Filmography ==
=== Film ===
==== As score composer ====
Year	Title	Director	Notes
1998	The Polar Bear	Til Schweiger; Granz Henman	Composed with Henning Lohner
2001	Invincible	Werner Herzog	Composed with Hans Zimmer
2001	The Pledge	Sean Penn	Composed with Hans Zimmer
2001	Extreme Days	Eric Hannah	Composed with TobyMac
2002	The Time Machine	Simon Wells	World Soundtrack Award for Discovery of the Year
2002	K-19: The Widowmaker	Kathryn Bigelow	
2002	Teknolust	Lynn Hershman Leeson	Composed with Ramin Djawadi
2002	Equilibrium	Kurt Wimmer	
2003	The Recruit	Roger Donaldson	
2003	Ned Kelly	Gregor Jordan	Composed with Bernard Fanning
2003	Basic	John McTiernan	
2003	The In-Laws	Andrew Fleming	Composed with James S. Levine
2003	Pirates of the Caribbean: The Curse of the Black Pearl	Gore Verbinski	Replaced Alan Silvestri ASCAP Award for Top Box Office Film; Nominated- Saturn Award for Best Music; Nominated- Online Film Critics Society Award for Best Original Score; Nominated- World Soundtrack Award for Best Original Score of the Year
2003	Beat the Drum	David Hickson	Composed with Ramin Djawadi
2004	Catwoman	Pitof	Replaced Graeme Revell Nominated- Stinkers Bad Movie Award for Most Intrusive Musical Score
2005	Constantine	Francis Lawrence	Composed with Brian Tyler ASCAP Award for Top Box Office Film; Nominated- IFMCA Award for Best Original Score for a Horror/Thriller Film
2005	The Promise	Chen Kaige	
2006	16 Blocks	Richard Donner	
2006	Ultraviolet	Kurt Wimmer	
2006	Poseidon	Wolfgang Petersen	
2006	Rescue Dawn	Werner Herzog	Composed with Ernst Reijseger
2007	Premonition	Mennan Yapo	
2007	Redline	Andy Cheng	Composed with Ian Honeyman & Andrew Raiher
2007	TMNT	Kevin Munroe	Replaced Marco Beltrami
2007	Skid Row	Ross Clarke; Niva Dorell; Marshall Tyler	Documentary film Composed with Craig Eastman
2008	Dragon Hunters	Guillaume Ivernel; Arthur Qwak	
2008	Starship Troopers 3: Marauder	Edward Neumeier	Themes by Basil Poledouris
2008	The Scorpion King 2: Rise of a Warrior	Russell Mulcahy	
2008	Anything for Her	Fred Cavayé	
2008	Killshot	John Madden	
2009	Solomon Kane	M.J. Bassett	
2009	Little Nicholas	Laurent Tirard	
2010	Heartbreaker	Pascal Chaumeil	
2010	The Extra Man	Shari Springer Berman; Robert Pulcini	
2010	22 Bullets	Richard Berry	
2010	Among Wolves	Gerardo Olivares	Composed with Andrew Raiher
2010	Shanghai	Mikael Håfström	
2010	Point Blank	Fred Cavayé	
2010	Small World	Bruno Chiche	Composed with Jean-Michel Bernard
2010	Waking Madison	Katherine Brooks	
2010	Dylan Dog: Dead of Night	Kevin Munroe	
2010	Happy People: A Year in the Taiga	Dmitry Vasyukov; Werner Herzog	Documentary film
2011	The Prodigies	Antoine Charreyron	
2011	The Floating Shadow	Jia Dongshuo	
2011	Jock the Hero Dog	Duncan MacNeillie	Composed with Ian Honeyman
2011	Seven Days in Utopia	Matt Russell	Composed with Christopher Carmichael
2011	Rebellion	Mathieu Kassovitz	
2011	The Oranges	Julian Farino	Composed with Andrew Raiher
2011	War of the Buttons	Yann Samuell	
2012	30° couleur	Lucien Jean-Baptiste; Philippe Larue	
2012	Shanghai Calling	Daniel Hsia	Composed with Christopher Carmichael
2012	Asterix and Obelix: God Save Britannia	Laurent Tirard	
2012	A Perfect Plan	Pascal Chaumeil	
2014	Supercondriaque	Dany Boon	
2014	The Identical	Dustin Marcellino	Composed with Christopher Carmichael
2014	Le Père Noël	Alexandre Coffre	
2015	Queen of the Desert	Werner Herzog	
2016	Radin!	Fred Cavayé	
2016	The Warriors Gate	Matthias Hoene	
2017	Leap!	Éric Summer; Éric Warin	
2017	Legend of the Demon Cat	Chen Kaige	Composed with Misha Segal

==== As composer of additional music ====
Year	Title	Director	Composer	Notes
1998	The Prince of Egypt	Brenda Chapman; Steve Hickner; Simon Wells	Hans Zimmer; Stephen Schwartz	
1998	The Thin Red Line	Terrence Malick	Hans Zimmer	
1999	Chill Factor	Hugh Johnson	Hans Zimmer; John Powell	
1999	The Devil and Ms. D	Bernd Eichinger	Henning Lohner	
2000	The Tigger Movie	Jun Falkenstein	Harry Gregson-Williams	
2000	The Road to El Dorado	Bibo Bergeron; Don Paul	Hans Zimmer; John Powell	
2000	Gladiator	Ridley Scott	Hans Zimmer; Lisa Gerrard	
2000	Mission: Impossible 2	John Woo	Hans Zimmer	
2000	X-Men	Bryan Singer	Michael Kamen	
2000	King of the Jungle	Seth Zvi Rosenfeld	Harry Gregson-Williams	
2001	Hannibal	Ridley Scott	Hans Zimmer	
2001	Pearl Harbor	Michael Bay	Hans Zimmer	
2004	Wimbledon	Richard Loncraine	Edward Shearmur	
2006	Miami Vice	Michael Mann	John Murphy	
2009	Lilly the Witch: The Dragon and the Magic Book	Stefan Ruzowitzky	Ian Honeyman	
2015	Help, I Shrunk My Teacher	Sven Unterwaldt, Jr.	Leland Cox; Karim Sebastian Elias	
2017	Lilly's Bewitched Christmas	Wolfgang Groos	Anne-Kathrin Dern	
2025	echoes of the pyramids			

=== Television ===
Year	Title	Notes
1994-95	Peter Strohm	10 episodes
1997-98	Tatort	16 episodes
2000	The Others	Theme music; 13 episodes
2004	Dark Kingdom: The Dragon King	Television film
2007	Random! Cartoons	Episode: "Kyle + Rosemary"
2008	The Charlemagne Code	Television film
2010	Spear of Destiny	Television film
2010	Ein Haus voller Töchter	35 episodes
2010	Tatort Internet	10 episodes
2011	Marco W. - 247 Tage im türkischen Gefängnis	Television film
2013-14	Lanfeust Quest	26 episodes
2014	Halo: Nightfall	Miniseries
2018	BaseBoys	2 episodes

=== Other ===
- Beijing Olympics Closing Ceremony

=== Video Games ===
- MotorStorm: Apocalypse (video game)
- Lords Mobile (video game)

== Awards ==
Year	Category	Project	Result
2001	Online Film Critics Society Award for Best Original Score	Gladiator	Nominated
2002	World Soundtrack Award for Discovery of the Year	The Time Machine	Won
2004	ASCAP Film and Television Music Awards Top Box Office Films	Pirates of the Caribbean: The Curse of the Black Pearl	Won
2004	Saturn Award Academy of Science Fiction, Fantasy & Horror Films, USA: Best Music	Pirates of the Caribbean: The Curse of the Black Pearl	Nominated
2004	Online Film Critics Society Award for Best Original Score	Pirates of the Caribbean: The Curse of the Black Pearl	Nominated
2004	World Soundtrack Award for Best Original Score of the Year	Pirates of the Caribbean: The Curse of the Black Pearl	Nominated
2005	International Film Music Critics Association: Best Original Score for a Horror/Thriller Film	Constantine	Nominated
2006	ASCAP Film and Television Music Awards Top Box Office Films	Constantine	Won
2008	German Television Awards Best Music	Die Jagd nach dem Schatz der Nibelungen	Nominated
2009	Rhode Island International Film Festival Crystal Image Award	N/A	Won
