= Lilly the Witch =

Animated television series

- Also known as: Lilly
- Genre: Action; Sci fi Fantasy Comedy
- Based on: Lilli the Witch by Knister
- Directed by: Luba Medekova-Klein (season 1); Sam Siahaija (season 2); Steffen Schäffler (season 3); Conrad Tambour (season 3); Benjamin Swiczinsky (season 3); Johannes Schiehsl (season 3)
- Theme music composer: Keith Hopwood
- Composers: Keith Hopwood (season 1-2); Mischa Krausz (season 3)
- Countries of origin: Germany; Canada (2004-07); Ireland (2004-07); Austria (2014); Belgium (2014)
- Original languages: German; English
- No. of seasons: 3
- No. of episodes: 52

Production
- Executive producers: Ralph Christians (season 1-2); Michael Coldewey (season 1-2); Marie-Josée Corbeil (season 1); Tilo Seiffert (season 2); Jean-Pierre Morin (season 2); Danielle Thériault (season 2); Bruno Dubé (season 2)
- Producers: François Brisson (season 1); Christine Côté (season 1); Simone Kraus (season 1-2); Jean-Pierre Morin (season 1); Daina Socco (season 1-2); Expand: Moe Honan (season 2); Danielle Thériault (season 2); Sandra Wollgast (season 3); Tilo Seiffert (season 3); Michael Coldewey (season 3); Danny Krausz (season 3); Kurt Stocker (season 3); Isabelle Welter (season 3); Arnauld de Battice (season 3); Mark Mertens (season 3); Jan Goossen (season 3)
- Running time: 23 minutes
- Production companies: Trixter Productions; Vivatoon Inc. (season 1-2); Magma Films (season 1-2); Trixter Entertainment (season 3); Dor Film (season 3); AT Animation (season 3)

Original release
- Network: KiKA; TVOKids (seasons 1-2)
- Release: 4 September 2004 – 31 October 2014

Lilly the Witch (also known as Lilly in the UK) is an animated television show based on the Lilli the Witch book series by the German author Knister. The first season debuted on TVOKids in Canada on 4 September 2004, and later premiered on KiKA in Germany one month later. The second season debuted in 2007 in both languages as well. The third season was broadcast only in German and featured a different animation style.

== Plot ==
Lilly the Witch focuses on the adventures of the titular character, an average young girl who one day stumbles upon an ancient, magical book and befriends its caretaker, Hector, a chubby dragon who comes to life and initiates her with the power of magic. Together, the two time travel all around the world.

== Characters ==
=== Main ===
- Lilly is a 9-year-old average girl who stumbles upon a magical book. She experiences many wild adventures that take her all around the world.
- Hector is a cheeky little green dragon who is an expert at magic. He is also Lilly's friend and companion who accompanies her in all her adventures.
- Leon is Lilly's little brother.

== Production ==
Lilly the Witch was produced by Trixter Productions in Germany, Vivatoon (Hector) Inc. in Canada, and Magma Films in Ireland for the first two seasons. 7 years after the second season was released, a third season of the series premiered on 26 September 2014 in Germany. The third season was produced by Trixter Entertainment in Germany, Dor Film in Austria, and AT-Anim in Belgium, with co-producer credits given to Westdeutscher Rundfunk, ARD, and Trixter Productions in Germany, ORF in Austria, and Umedia in Belgium. As the first two seasons had a simplified animation style using traditional cel animation, this new season used a more detailed digital animation style using Flash animation. The crew of the series was mostly changed due to the studio switches, and Lilly's new design is much closer to the original books.

== Episodes ==
=== Series overview ===
Series	Episodes	Originally released	
Series	Episodes	First released	Last released
1	13	4 September 2004	1 November 2004
2	13	2 March 2007	25 May 2007
3	26	26 September 2014	31 October 2014

=== Season 1 (2004) ===
No.	Title	Directed by	Written by	Original release date	German air date
1	"Lilly in the Wild West"	Luba Medekova-Klein	Armin Prediger	4 September 2004	14 October 2004
2	"Lilly and the Legend of Prince Charming"	Luba Medekova-Klein	Armin Prediger	11 September 2004	15 October 2004
3	"Lilly in the Stone Age"	Luba Medekova-Klein	Louise Geraghty	18 September 2004	18 October 2004
4	"Lilly and Atlantis"	Luba Medekova-Klein	Armin Prediger	25 September 2004	19 October 2004
5	"Lilly and the Dinosaurs"	Luba Medekova-Klein	Richie Conroy	2 October 2004	20 October 2004
6	"Lilly and the Mystery of the Mummy"	Luba Medekova-Klein	Armin Prediger	9 October 2004	21 October 2004
7	"Lilly and the Loch Ness Monster"	Luba Medekova-Klein	Armin Prediger	16 October 2004	22 October 2004
8	"Lilly and Hercules"	Luba Medekova-Klein	Mark Hodkinson	23 October 2004	25 October 2004
9	"Lilly and the Giant Insects"	Luba Medekova-Klein	Armin Prediger	30 October 2004	26 October 2004
10	"Lilly and the Vikings"	Luba Medekova-Klein	Mark Hodkinson	6 November 2004	27 October 2004
11	"Lilly and Robin Hood"	Luba Medekova-Klein	Armin Prediger	13 November 2004	28 October 2004
12	"Lilly in the Rain Forest"	Luba Medekova-Klein	Armin Prediger	20 November 2004	29 October 2004
13	"Lilly and Leonardo"	Luba Medekova-Klein	Marcus Fleming	27 November 2004	1 November 2004

=== Season 2 (2007) ===
No. overall	No. in season	Title	Directed by	Written by	Original release date	German air date
14	1	"Lilly and King Arthur"	Sam Siahaija	Louise Geraghty	15 June 2007	9 May 2007
15	2	"Lilly in the New World"	Sam Siahaija	Armin Prediger	22 June 2007	10 May 2007
16	3	"Lilly and the Musketeers"	Sam Siahaija	Armin Prediger	9 April 2007	11 May 2007
17	4	"Lilly and Houdini"	Sam Siahaija	Armin Prediger	3 March 2007	14 May 2007
18	5	"Lilly and the Goldrush"	Sam Siahaija	Louise Geraghty	2 March 2007	15 May 2007
19	6	"Lilly Around the World in Eight Days"	Sam Siahaija	Armin Prediger	9 March 2007	16 May 2007
20	7	"Lilly and the Master Detective"	Sam Siahaija	Marcus Fleming	7 May 2007	17 May 2007
21	8	"Lilly in Hollywood"	Sam Siahaija	Armin Prediger	3 August 2007	18 May 2007
22	9	"Lilly and the Leprechauns"	Sam Siahaija	Richie Conroy	7 April 2007	21 May 2007
23	10	"Lilly and Frankenstein's Monster"	Sam Siahaija	Linda O'Sullivan	6 April 2007	22 May 2007
24	11	"Lilly in China"	Sam Siahaija	Armin Prediger	21 April 2007	23 May 2007
25	12	"Lilly and the Pirates"	Sam Siahaija	Marcus Fleming	28 April 2007	24 May 2007
26	13	"Lilly on the Moon"	Sam Siahaija	Marteinn Thorisson	24 June 2007	25 May 2007

=== Season 3 (2014) ===
No. overall	No. in season	Title	Directed by	Written by	Storyboard by	Original release date
27	1	"Lilly and the Secret Room"	Steffen Schäffler, Conrad Tambour, Benjamin Swiczinsky, and Johannes Schiehsl	Hannes Wirlinger and Eva Wehrum	Jan Siggel	26 September 2014
28	2	"Lilly and the Mongolian Horse"	Steffen Schäffler, Conrad Tambour, Benjamin Swiczinsky, and Johannes Schiehsl	Eva Wehrum and Elisabeth Schmied	Jan Siggel	29 September 2014
29	3	"Lilly and the Incas"	Steffen Schäffler, Conrad Tambour, Benjamin Swiczinsky, and Johannes Schiehsl	Chloé Buirette and Christophe Beaujean	Jan Siggel	30 September 2014
30	4	"Lilly and the Dragon Island"	Conrad Tambour, Benjamin Swiczinsky, and Johannes Schiehsl	Julia Rakotoniaina-Waldner	Andrew Kelly	1 October 2014
31	5	"Princess Lilly"	Steffen Schäffler, Conrad Tambour, Benjamin Swiczinsky, and Johannes Schiehsl	Katarina Bali	Jan Siggel	2 October 2014
32	6	"Lilly and the Shark Babies"	Steffen Schäffler, Conrad Tambour, Benjamin Swiczinsky, and Johannes Schiehsl	Barbara Schärf	Jan Siggel	3 October 2014
33	7	"Lilly and the Polar Bears"	Steffen Schäffler, Conrad Tambour, Benjamin Swiczinsky, and Johannes Schiehsl	Christina Erbertz	Jan Siggel	6 October 2014
34	8	"Lilly and Hector's Big Dream"	Steffen Schäffler, Conrad Tambour, Benjamin Swiczinsky, and Johannes Schiehsl	Arno Krimmer and Eva Wehrum	Jan Siggel	7 October 2014
35	9	"Lilly and the Opera Divas"	Steffen Schäffler, Conrad Tambour, Benjamin Swiczinsky, and Johannes Schiehsl	Ariane Payen and Eva Wehrum	Jan Siggel	8 October 2014
36	10	"Lilly in the Desert"	Steffen Schäffler, Conrad Tambour, Benjamin Swiczinsky, and Johannes Schiehsl	Grégory Lecocq	Jan Siggel	9 October 2014
37	11	"Lilly and the Magic Sword"	Steffen Schäffler, Conrad Tambour, Benjamin Swiczinsky, and Johannes Schiehsl	Sylvestre Sbille and Eva Wehrum	Jan Siggel	10 October 2014
38	12	"Lilly and the Dragon Spa"	Steffen Schäffler, Conrad Tambour, Benjamin Swiczinsky, and Johannes Schiehsl	Eva Wehrum	Jan Siggel	13 October 2014
39	13	"Lilly and the Hiccup"	Steffen Schäffler, Conrad Tambour, Benjamin Swiczinsky, and Johannes Schiehsl	Steve Middleton and Arno Krimmer	Jan Siggel	14 October 2014
40	14	"Lilly and the Olympics"	Steffen Schäffler, Conrad Tambour, Benjamin Swiczinsky, and Johannes Schiehsl	Steve Middleton	Jan Siggel	15 October 2014
41	15	"Lilly and the Pharaoh's Curse"	Steffen Schäffler, Conrad Tambour, Benjamin Swiczinsky, and Johannes Schiehsl	Eva Wehrum and Julia Rakotoniaina-Waldner	Jan Siggel	16 October 2014
42	16	"Lilly and the Perfume"	Steffen Schäffler, Conrad Tambour, Benjamin Swiczinsky, and Johannes Schiehsl	Cécile Lugiez	Jan Siggel	17 October 2014
43	17	"Lilly and the Cooking Contest"	Steffen Schäffler, Conrad Tambour, Benjamin Swiczinsky, and Johannes Schiehsl	Grégory Lecocq	Jan Siggel	20 October 2014
44	18	"Lilly and the Crazy Robot House"	Steffen Schäffler, Conrad Tambour, Benjamin Swiczinsky, and Johannes Schiehsl	Grégory Lecocq	Jan Siggel	21 October 2014
45	19	"Lilly and the Little Indian"	Steffen Schäffler, Conrad Tambour, Benjamin Swiczinsky, and Johannes Schiehsl	Christina Erbertz	Jan Siggel	22 October 2014
46	20	"Lilly and the Grand Escape"	Steffen Schäffler, Conrad Tambour, Benjamin Swiczinsky, and Johannes Schiehsl	Christophe Beaujean	Jan Siggel	23 October 2014
47	21	"Lilly and the First Bike of the World"	Steffen Schäffler, Conrad Tambour, Benjamin Swiczinsky, and Johannes Schiehsl	Cécile Lugiez and Eva Wehrum	Jan Siggel	24 October 2014
48	22	"Lilly and the Magic Lamp"	Steffen Schäffler, Conrad Tambour, Benjamin Swiczinsky, and Johannes Schiehsl	Steve Middleton	Jan Siggel	27 October 2014
49	23	"Lilly and Hector in Down Under"	Steffen Schäffler, Conrad Tambour, Benjamin Swiczinsky, and Johannes Schiehsl	Eva Wehrum and Cécile Lugiez	Jan Siggel	28 October 2014
50	24	"Lilly and the Kung Fu Monk"	Steffen Schäffler, Conrad Tambour, Benjamin Swiczinsky, and Johannes Schiehsl	Christophe Beaujean	Jan Siggel	29 October 2014
51	25	"Lilly and the Secret of the Vanished Bees"	Steffen Schäffler, Conrad Tambour, Benjamin Swiczinsky, and Johannes Schiehsl	Eva Wehrum and Grégory Lecocq	Jan Siggel	30 October 2014
52	26	"Lilly and the Vampire Village"	Steffen Schäffler, Conrad Tambour, Benjamin Swiczinsky, and Johannes Schiehsl	Steve Middleton and Eva Wehrum	Jan Siggel	31 October 2014

== Broadcast ==
Lilly the Witch debuted on TVOKids in Canada on 4 September 2004. It also aired on CBBC in the UK on 6 September. The series later premiered in the German language on KiKA in Germany on 14 October 2004, and would continue to air the third season in 2014. The first two seasons also aired on CBBC in the United Kingdom between 25 April and 4 November 2007 with the title "Lilly", and a revised theme song omitting any mention of her being a witch.
