= The Time Machine (2002 film) =

Science fiction film by Simon Wells

- Theatrical release poster
- Directed by: Simon Wells
- Screenplay by: John Logan
- Based on: The Time Machine 1960 movie by George Pal and David Duncan; The Time Machine 1895 novel by H. G. Wells
- Produced by: Walter F. Parkes; David Valdes
- Starring: Guy Pearce; Samantha Mumba; Orlando Jones; Mark Addy; Jeremy Irons
- Cinematography: Donald McAlpine
- Edited by: Wayne Wahrman
- Music by: Klaus Badelt
- Production company: Parkes/MacDonald
- Distributed by: DreamWorks Pictures (United States and Canada); Warner Bros. Pictures (International)
- Release date: March 8, 2002
- Running time: 96 minutes
- Country: United States
- Language: English
- Budget: $80 million
- Box office: $123.7 million

The Time Machine is a 2002 American post-apocalyptic science fiction action adventure film loosely adapted by John Logan from the 1895 novel of the same name by H. G. Wells and the 1960 film of the same name by George Pal and David Duncan. Arnold Leibovit served as executive producer, and Simon Wells, the great-grandson of the original author, served as director. The film stars Guy Pearce, Orlando Jones, Samantha Mumba in her film debut, Mark Addy, and Jeremy Irons, and includes a cameo by Alan Young, who also appeared in the 1960 film adaptation. The film is set in New York City instead of London. It contains new story elements not present in the original novel or the 1960 film adaptation, including a romantic subplot, a new scenario about how civilization was destroyed, and several new characters, such as an artificially intelligent hologram and a Morlock leader.

The film received mixed to negative reviews from critics and grossed $123 million worldwide. It was nominated for the Academy Award for Best Makeup (John M. Elliot Jr. and Barbara Lorenz) at the 75th Academy Awards, but lost to Frida.

== Plot ==
In 1899, inventor Alexander Hartdegen teaches at Columbia University in New York. Unlike his friend, David Philby, Alex prefers pure research to working in the business world. After a mugger kills his fiancée Emma, Alex builds a time machine to travel back in time to save her. After completing the machine in 1903, Alex travels back to 1899 and prevents her murder, only for her to be killed again in a road accident.

Realizing that any attempt to save Emma will always fail, Alex travels to 2030 to discover if science has discovered how to change the past. At the New York Public Library, holographic librarian Vox 114 insists time travel to the past is impossible. Alex travels on to 2037, immediately following lunar colonists having accidentally destroyed the Moon, and will render the Earth virtually uninhabitable.

While activating the machine, flying debris knocks Alex unconscious. He awakens 800,000 years later on July 16, 802,701. The Earth has healed, and the human race has reverted to a Stone Age-like lifestyle. Some survivors, called "Eloi", live on the cliff sides of what was once Manhattan. A woman named Mara nurses Alex back to health. She is one of the few Eloi who speaks English. He observes the broken moon and realizes that maybe his teachings led to this future, just like Philby said. The same night, Alex and Mara's younger brother, Kalen, dream of a jagged-toothed face and a creature calling their name. When Alex tells Mara about the dream, she says they all have that dream. She then notices that his pocket watch is missing. The next day, the Eloi are attacked by ape-like creatures called "Morlocks" who hunt them. Mara is dragged underground along with several other Eloi. To rescue Mara, Kalen leads Alex to Vox 114, which is still functional after 800,000 years.

After Vox reveals how to find the Morlocks, Alex enters their underground lair through an opening that resembles the face in his nightmare. He is captured and taken to where Mara is caged. Alex meets an intelligent, humanoid Über-Morlock, who explains that Morlocks descend from the humans who went underground after the Moon broke apart, while the Eloi evolved from those remaining on the surface. The Über-Morlocks are telepaths and rule the lower Morlocks, who use the Eloi as food and breeding stock.

The Über-Morlock confirms that Alex cannot alter Emma's fate; since her death drove him to build the time machine, saving her would prevent its construction and cause a grandfather paradox. The Über-Morlock shows Alexander the time machine, gives back his watch, and orders him to return to his own time. Alex gets into the machine but pulls the Über-Morlock in, carrying them into the future as they struggle. The Über-Morlock dies by rapidly aging when Alex pushes him outside the machine's temporal bubble. Alex stops in 635,427,810 with a harsh, rust-colored sky over a wasteland.

Accepting that Emma cannot be saved, Alex travels back to rescue Mara. After freeing her, he starts the time machine and jams its gears with the pocket watch, distorting time. Pursued by the Morlocks, Alex and Mara escape to the surface as the time distortion explodes, killing the Morlocks throughout the valley and destroying their caves and the time machine. Alex begins a new life with Mara and the Eloi, while Vox 114 helps educate them.

In 1903, Philby and Mrs. Watchit, Alex's housekeeper, discuss his absence while in his laboratory. Believing that Alex has found peace wherever he is, Philby offers Mrs. Watchit a housekeeper job. Outside, Philby tosses away his bowler hat to honor Alex rejecting blind conformity.

== Cast ==
- Guy Pearce as Alexander Hartdegen, associate professor of applied mechanics and engineering at Columbia University
- Samantha Mumba as Mara, a young Eloi woman who becomes Alexander's love interest
- Mark Addy as David Philby, Alexander's good friend
- Sienna Guillory as Emma, Alexander's fiancée
- Phyllida Law as Mrs. Watchit, Alexander's housekeeper
- Alan Young as a flower store worker
- Omero Mumba as Kalen, Mara's younger brother
- Yancey Arias as Toren, an adult male Eloi
- Orlando Jones as Vox, a holographic artificial intelligence librarian at the New York Public Library in the future
- Jeremy Irons as the Über-Morlock, a member of the telepathic-ruling caste of the Morlock world

== Production ==
The film was a co-production of DreamWorks and Warner Bros. Pictures in association with Arnold Leibovit Entertainment, who obtained the rights to the 1960 film adaptation of The Time Machine and collectively negotiated the deal that made it possible for both DreamWorks and Warner Bros. to make the movie. Leibovit was interested in making a new film since the 1980s.

=== Filming ===
Steven Spielberg was originally set to direct, but moved on to other projects. Then, Brad Silberling took over, but left over creative differences. Simon Wells, who had been directing animated films for Spielberg since An American Tail: Fievel Goes West, was interested in getting into live-action, so he went to Jeffrey Katzenberg saying, "I really ought to be directing this because, you know, the name!" Despite having never directed a live-action movie before, producers Walter F. Parkes and Laurie MacDonald recognized that because of Wells' animation background, the extensive visual effects work on the film would not be difficult for him to handle.

Director Gore Verbinski was brought in to take over the last 18 days of shooting, as Wells was suffering from "extreme exhaustion." Wells returned for post-production. Filming began in February 2001 and finished on May 29, 2001.

=== Special effects ===
The Morlocks were depicted using actors in costumes wearing animatronic masks created by Stan Winston Studio. For scenes in which they run on all fours faster than humanly possible, Industrial Light & Magic created CGI versions of the creatures.

Many time-traveling scenes were entirely computer generated, including a 33-second shot in the workshop where the time machine is located. The camera pulls out, traveling through New York City and then into space, past the ISS, and ends with a space plane landing at the Moon to reveal Earth's future lunar colonies. Plants and buildings are shown springing up and then being replaced by new growth in a constant cycle. In later shots, the effects team used an erosion algorithm to simulate the Earth's landscape changing through the centuries digitally

For some of the lighting effects used for the digital time bubble around the time machine, ILM developed an extended-range color format, which they named rgbe (red, green, blue, and an exponent channel) (See Paul E. Debevec and Jitendra Malik, "Recovering High Dynamic Range Radiance Maps from Photographs, Siggraph Proceedings, 1997).

=== Soundtrack ===
A full score was written by Klaus Badelt, with the recognizable theme being the track "I Don't Belong Here", which was later used in the 2008 Discovery Channel miniseries When We Left Earth.

In 2002, the film's soundtrack won the World Soundtrack Award for Discovery of the Year.

== Release and reception ==
The film's original release date was December 2001, but it was moved to March 2002 to avoid competition with The Lord of the Rings: The Fellowship of the Ring. In addition, a scene was removed from the Moon destruction sequence showing pieces of the Moon crashing into buildings in New York because it looked too similar visually to the September 11 attacks.

=== Box office ===
The film grossed $22 million at #1 ahead of We Were Soldiers and All About the Benjamins during the opening weekend of March 8–10, 2002. The film eventually earned $56 million in North America and $123 million worldwide.

=== Critical reaction ===
The film holds a 28% rating on Rotten Tomatoes based on 156 reviews with an average rating of 4.79/10. The site's critical consensus reads, "This Machine has all the razzle-dazzles of modern special effects, but the movie takes a turn for the worse when it switches from a story about lost love to a confusing action-thriller." Metacritic assigned the film a weighted average score of 42 out of 100, based on 33 critics, indicating "mixed or average reviews". Audiences polled by CinemaScore gave the film an average grade of "C+" on an A+ to F scale.

William Arnold of the Seattle Post-Intelligencer, who was somewhat positive about the film, wrote that it lost some of the simplicity and charm of the 1960 George Pal film by adding characters such as Jeremy Irons' "über-morlock". He praised actor Guy Pearce's "more eccentric" time traveler and his transition from an awkward intellectual to a man of action. Victoria Alexander of Filmsinreview.com wrote that "The Time Machine is a loopy love story with good special effects but a storyline that's logically incomprehensible," noting some "plot holes" having to deal with Hartdegen and his machine's cause-and-effect relationship with the outcome of the future. Jay Carr of the Boston Globe wrote: "The truth is that Wells wasn't that penetrating a writer when it came to probing character or the human heart. His speculations and gimmicks were what propelled his books. The film, given the chance to deepen its source, instead falls back on its gadgets."

Some critics praised the special effects, declaring the film visually impressive and colorful, while others thought the effects were poor. Roger Ebert of the Chicago Sun-Times scorned the film and found the Morlock animation cartoonish and unrealistic because of their manner of leaping and running. Ebert notes the contrast in terms of the social/racial representation of the attractive Eloi between the two films, between the "dusky sun people" of this version and the Nordic race in the George Pal film. Aside from its vision of the future, the film's recreation of New York at the turn of the century won it some praise. Bruce Westbrook of the Houston Chronicle writes, "The far future may be awesome to consider, but from period detail to matters of the heart, this film is most transporting when it stays put in the past."

In an interview with The Sydney Morning Herald, Guy Pearce described the shoot as a gruelling test of patience and nerves. He also admitted that "I'm not at all happy with what I did in it," adding that "there were producers saying, 'What are you doing? We don't like what you're doing!.'" In a 2024 interview with GQ, Pearce added that "I think the process of it felt way too big for me. I can't make [sense of] this idea of studio films where you just get told what to do by people afraid to lose their jobs. I remember there were discussions at the beginning about how I was going to look. A couple of the executives say, ‘No, he'll just cut his hair and he'll just do this and he'll do that.’ And I'm in the room going, Hello? I'm immediately feeling like my intuition doesn't mean anything here. That's a killer for me. It was the first time I really felt that there was not just a disconnect, but a kind of greater power up there that you couldn't even really talk to."

In a 2011 interview with Animated Views, Simon Wells admitted that "The Time Machine was a really tough film. It was a much bigger film than I had anticipated. I knew it was big, but I hadn't been aware of how draining it was going to be. That made it a not entirely pleasant experience. I'm pretty happy with the way the movie came out in the end. But it was tough; it didn't help that it was my first live-action film. I was learning on the job – on a film that kept changing to essentially a different film." He went on to add that "there was stuff that really wasn’t as satisfying about the story as it should have been. I was aware of that, while shooting, but unable to do anything about it."
