= Ian Honeyman =

American film composer

- Born: 14 August 1978 (age 47)
- Origin: Madison, Wisconsin, United States
- Genres: Film scores
- Occupations: Composer, producer
- Instruments: Piano, violin
- Years active: 1990–present
- Website: ianhoneyman.com

Ian Honeyman (born 14 August 1978) is an American Los Angeles-based film composer. He has written music for feature films, short films, TV shows.

== Life and career ==
After studying with composers Chen Yi and Nicholas Maw at Peabody Conservatory, Honeyman moved to Santa Monica, California, to pursue his interest in composing music for film. Alongside German composer Klaus Badelt, he contributed music to films including Constantine (2005), and Poseidon (2006).

He went on to score a number of films on his own, including Lilly the Witch: The Dragon and the Magic Book. In 2012 he received an Award Of Merit at the Global Music Awards for his score to the film The Philly Kid.

Ian lives in Marina Del Rey, California, with his wife Joanna.

== Filmography ==
- Vartan LLP (Short) (2007)
- Redline (2007)
- The Charlemagne Code (TV Movie) (2008)
- Charlie Thistle (Short) (2008)
- Lilly the Witch: The Dragon and the Magic Book (2009)
- Acholiland (Short) (2009)
- Operation: Endgame (2010)
- Ein Mann geht seinen Weg (2010)
- Ein Haus voller Töchter (TV Series) (1 episode) (2010)
- Triple Dog (2010)
- Tatort Internet - Schützt endlich unsere Kinder (TV Series) (2010)
- Lilly the Witch: The Journey to Mandolan (2011)
- 51 (2011)
- MotorStorm: Apocalypse (Video Game) (2011)
- Jock the Hero Dog (2011)
- Tatort Ausland - Mörderische Reise (TV Series documentary) (2011)
- The Philly Kid (2013)
- Daniel Brewster and the End of the World (Short) (2013)
- Ein schmaler Grat (2013)
- Gore Vidal: The United States of Amnesia (Documentary) (2013)
- Der blinde Fleck (2013)
- Hank: 5 Years from the Brink (Documentary) (2013)
- Infection (Short) (2013)
- An Interview with God (2018)
- Cured (2020)
