= William J. Tuttle =

American make-up artist (1912–2007)

- William J. Tuttle with some of his creations for MGM in 1970.
- Born: William Julian Tuttle; April 13, 1912; Jacksonville, Florida, US
- Died: July 27, 2007 (aged 95); Pacific Palisades, California, US
- Occupation: Make-up artist
- Spouses: Donna Reed (m. 1943; div. 1945) Gloria Gilbert (divorced) Marie Kopicki (died 1961) Elizabeth L. Muskie (m. 1962, divorced) Anita B. Aros (m. 1967)
- Children: 2

William Julian Tuttle (April 13, 1912 – July 27, 2007) was an American make-up artist.

== Early life ==
Born in Jacksonville, Florida, he was forced to leave school at a young age to support his mother and younger brother. After a series of odd-jobs and a brief stint in his own band, Tuttle moved to Los Angeles in 1930 and began taking art classes at the University of Southern California, where he would meet his future collaborator Charles Schram. Around the same time, he began working as a page at Fox Studios.

== Career ==
Tuttle began working under makeup artist Jack Dawn at Twentieth Century Pictures. In 1934, Tuttle and Dawn moved to Metro-Goldwyn-Mayer. Working as Dawn's assistant, Tuttle supervised the makeup work in such movies as The Wizard of Oz and Father of the Bride.

Tuttle created makeup for many of Hollywood's biggest stars, among them Judy Garland (“Summer Stock”, 1950); Gene Kelly (“Singin’ in the Rain”, 1952); Katharine Hepburn (“Pat and Mike”, 1952) and Esther Williams (“Million Dollar Mermaid”, 1952). Eventually, he worked his way up to head of the studio's makeup department.

In the 1950s, he would be responsible for the makeup in Singin' in the Rain, Seven Brides For Seven Brothers, Forbidden Planet, North by Northwest and The Time Machine. He reused pieces he first created for The Time Machine in "Eye of the Beholder", one of his many Twilight Zone contributions.

In 1965, Tuttle received a special Oscar for his work on George Pal's 7 Faces of Dr. Lao; this was 17 years before makeup became an official Oscar category. Later work included Logan's Run and Young Frankenstein. Tuttle is the subject of the 1968 MGM short The King of the Duplicators where he demonstrated some of his work. He also appeared as himself in the documentary film The Fantasy Film Worlds of George Pal (1985), produced and directed by Arnold Leibovit.

Later in life, Tuttle managed his company known as Custom Color Cosmetics.

== Personal life ==
Tuttle was married five times. He was the first husband of Oscar-winning film and television star Donna Reed. He and his third wife, Marie Kopicki, had two children, daughter Teresa, and son John. John predeceased his father.

- Donna Reed (January 30,1943 – January 8,1945) (divorced)
- Gloria Gilbert (194? – 194?) (divorced)
- Marie Kopicki (1946 – June 4, 1961) (her death); 2 children
- Elizabeth L. Muskie (October 13, 1962 – 1966) (divorced)
- Anita B Aros (March 25, 1967 – July 27, 2007) (his death)

William Tuttle died, aged 95, from natural causes at his home in Pacific Palisades, California, survived by his wife, Anita and his daughter, Teresa.

== See also ==
- Fred Phillips (makeup artist)
