= Whit Bissell =

American character actor (1909–1996)

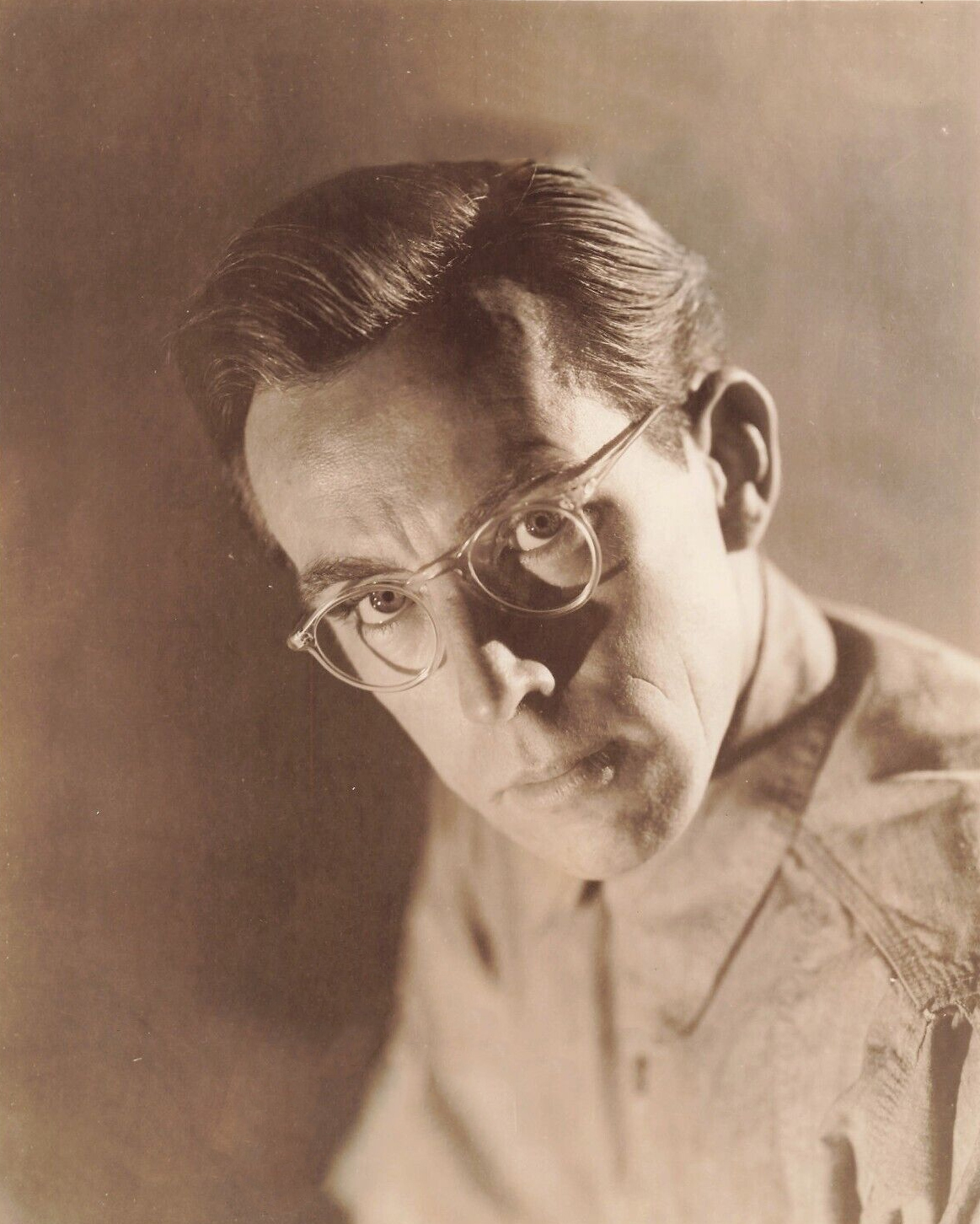
- Bissell in 1947
- Born: Whitner Nutting Bissell; October 25, 1909; New York City, New York, U.S.
- Died: March 5, 1996 (aged 86); Woodland Hills, Los Angeles, California, U.S.
- Resting place: Westwood Village Memorial Park Cemetery
- Education: Dalton School; University of North Carolina
- Occupation: Actor
- Years active: 1933–1991
- Known for: The Time Tunnel; The Time Machine
- Spouses: Adrienne Marden (m. 1938; div. 1954) Dilys Mary Shan Jukes (m. 1954; died 1958) Jennifer Raine (m. 1967; died 1993)
- Children: 4, including stepson Brian Forster

Whitner Nutting Bissell (October 25, 1909 – March 5, 1996) was an American character actor.

== Early life ==
Born in New York City, Bissell was the son of surgeon Dr. J. Dougal Bissell and Helen Nutting Bissell. He was educated at the Allen-Stevenson School and the Dalton School in New York City. He was related to Daniel Bissell, who was awarded the Badge of Military Merit, the predecessor of the Purple Heart, by George Washington.

He trained with the Carolina Playmakers, a theatrical organization associated with the University of North Carolina at Chapel Hill, where he majored in drama and English.

== Career ==
Bissell had a number of roles in Broadway theatre, including the Air Force show Winged Victory, when he was an airman serving in the United States Army Air Forces.

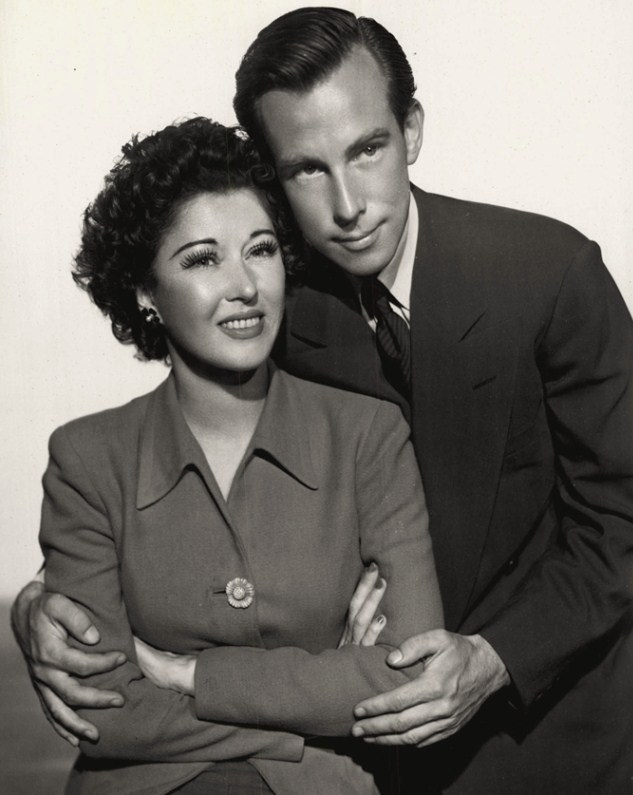
Erin O'Brien Moore and Whit Bissel in The Hasty Heart (1949)

In a film career that began with Holy Matrimony (1943), Bissell appeared in hundreds of films and television episodes as a prominent character actor. Regularly cast in low-budget science fiction and horror films, his roles include a mad scientist in the film I Was a Teenage Werewolf (1957) and Professor Frankenstein in I Was a Teenage Frankenstein (also 1957).

He played the attending psychiatrist who treats the protagonist, Dr. Miles Bennell, played by Kevin McCarthy, in Invasion of the Body Snatchers (1956) and appeared in Creature from the Black Lagoon (1954).

Bissell appeared as a guest star in many television drama series between the early 1950s and the mid-1970s, with more sporadic appearances after that. He guest-starred in a couple of episodes of The Lone Ranger. He appeared on other syndicated series, including The Sheriff of Cochise, Whirlybirds, Peyton Place and The Brothers Brannagan. He was cast in the religion series Crossroads and Going My Way, and in the NBC education drama series Mr. Novak.

Bissell played murderer Larry Sands on CBS's Perry Mason ("The Case of the Crooked Candle", 1957), along with Max Pompey in "The Case of the Lavender Lipstick" (1960), Laurence Barlow in "The Case of the Nautical Knot" (1964) and Dennison Groody in "The Case of the Carefree Coronary" (1965). He appeared in an episode of Mr. Adams and Eve in 1957 and of Peter Gunn in 1958. He played different roles in multiple episodes of the ABC series The Rifleman, and as Sinclair Bruder in "The Great Guy" (1956) on Father Knows Best.

Bissell portrayed the undertaker (who sees every man, no matter his race, as "just another future customer") in the film The Magnificent Seven (1960).

In 1960, Bissell appeared in George Pal's production of The Time Machine as Walter Kemp, one of the Time Traveller's dining friends. He also appeared in a 1978 TV movie adapting the H. G. Wells novel for a more modern setting. Bissell's Time Tunnel co-star John Zaremba also appeared in the telemovie. Thirty-three years later, in 1993 the documentary film Time Machine: The Journey Back (which featured Bissell, Rod Taylor and Alan Young), Bissell recreated his 1960 role as Walter in the opening sequence. It was Bissell's last acting performance.

From 1959 to 1961, Bissell was a regular for the third and fourth seasons of the television series Bachelor Father, costarring John Forsythe, Noreen Corcoran, and Sammee Tong. He appeared in an episode of Straightaway in 1961. He was cast three times on the NBC Western series The Virginian.

Bissell played General Heywood Kirk in 30 episodes in the 1966–1967 season of the science-fiction television series The Time Tunnel. He often played silver-haired figures of authority, here as in many other roles (as described by AllMovie), "instantly establishing his standard screen characterization of fussy officiousness", leavened in many instances with a military bearing. Other examples of such authoritative roles as military or police officials, include appearances in The Caine Mutiny, The Magnificent Seven (1960), The Manchurian Candidate, Hud (1963), The Outer Limits (1963), Hogan's Heroes (1966), The Man from U.N.C.L.E. (1966) and Soylent Green (1973). Bissell also appeared in the Barnaby Jones episode, "Murder in the Doll's House" (March 25, 1973).

Bissell appeared in the classic episode "The Trouble with Tribbles" of Star Trek, footage of which was re-used in the Star Trek: Deep Space Nine episode, "Trials and Tribble-ations".

In 1978 and 1980, Bissell appeared in two episodes of The Incredible Hulk, first in the second-season episode "Kindred Spirits" as Professor Williams, and later as Professor John Zeiderman in the second part of the fourth season two-parter "Prometheus".

Bissell was a guest of honor at New York City's Tele-Fantasy Con 1975 on August 1 - 3, along with celebrities Noel Neill, Jim Danforth and Joseph Stefano, and spent the weekend meeting his fans and signing hundreds of autographs free of charge. He also received a life career award from the Academy of Science Fiction, Fantasy and Horror Films in 1994. He also served for many years on the board of directors of the Screen Actors Guild, and represented the actors' branch of the Academy of Motion Picture Arts and Sciences board of governors.

== Personal life ==
Bissell was married three times and had three daughters (Kathy Marden, Victoria Brown and Amanda Whiteley) and a stepson, Brian Forster. Forster was the second actor to play the role of Chris Partridge on The Partridge Family TV series.

Wives:

- Adrienne Marden (November 23, 1938 – 1954; divorced); 2 children
- Dilys Mary Shan Jukes (December 5, 1954 – January 11, 1958; her death); 1 child
- Jennifer Raine (November 24, 1967 – January 5, 1993; her death)

Bissell was a practicing Unitarian and a lifelong member of the Democratic Party.

== Death ==
Bissell died on March 5, 1996 (aged 86) at the Motion Picture & Television Country House and Hospital in Woodland Hills, Los Angeles, California. He had suffered from Parkinson's disease. He was interred in the Westwood Village Memorial Park Cemetery in Los Angeles.

== Broadway roles ==
- The Star-Wagon (1937) as Park
- The American Way (1939) as Karl
- Two On An Island (1940) Frederic Winthorp
- Cafe Crown (1942) as Walter
- Winged Victory (1943) as Lieutenant Jules Hudson

== Selected filmography ==
- The Sea Hawk (1940) as Gate Guard at Palace Entrance (uncredited)
- Holy Matrimony (1943) as Harry Leek (uncredited)
- Destination Tokyo (1943) as Yo Yo (uncredited)
- Winged Victory (1944) as Lieutenant Hudson (uncredited)
- The Horn Blows at Midnight (1945) as Heavenly Piccolo Player (uncredited)
- Cluny Brown (1946) as Archie, Dowager's Son (uncredited)
- Somewhere in the Night (1946) as John (uncredited)
- It Shouldn't Happen to a Dog (1946) as Chester Frye (uncredited)
- The Sea of Grass (1947) as Ted, the Clerk (uncredited)
- Brute Force (1947) as Tom Lister
- Night Song (1947) as Party Guest (uncredited)
- A Double Life (1947) as Dr. Stauffer
- The Senator Was Indiscreet (1947) as Oakes
- Another Part of the Forest (1948) as Jugger
- Raw Deal (1948) as Murderer
- Canon City (1948) as Richard Heilman
- That Lady in Ermine (1948) as Giulio
- He Walked by Night (1948) as Paul Reeves
- Chicken Every Sunday (1949) as Mr. Robinson / Robby
- The Crime Doctor's Diary (1949) as Pete Bellem
- Anna Lucasta (1949) as Stanley
- Tokyo Joe (1949) as Captain Winnow (uncredited)
- And Baby Makes Three (1949) as Party Guest (uncredited)
- Side Street (1949) as Harold Simpson
- When Willie Comes Marching Home (1950) as Lieutenant M.J. Hanley, Psychiatrist (uncredited)
- Perfect Strangers (1950) as Mr. Lister, Defense Attorney (uncredited)
- Convicted (1950) as States Attorney Owens (uncredited)
- A Life of Her Own (1950) as Rental Agent (uncredited)
- Wyoming Mail (1950) as Sam
- The Killer That Stalked New York (1950) as Sid Bennet
- The Du Pont Story (1950) as Dr. Wallace Carothers
- For Heaven's Sake (1950) as Doctor (uncredited)
- The Great Missouri Raid (1951) as Bob Ford
- The Red Badge of Courage (1951) as Wounded Officer (uncredited)
- Tales of Robin Hood (1951) as Will Stutely
- Sealed Cargo (1951) as Schuster (uncredited)
- Night into Morning (1951) as Monument Salesman (uncredited)
- Lost Continent (1951) as Stanley Briggs
- The Family Secret (1951) as Joe Elsner
- Red Mountain (1951) as Miles
- Boots Malone (1952) as Lou Dyer (uncredited)
- Hoodlum Empire (1952) as Filby, The Pickpocket (uncredited)
- Skirts Ahoy! (1952) as Mr. Yarbrough (uncredited)
- The Sellout (1952) as Wilfred Jackson
- The Turning Point (1952) as Buck (uncredited)
- Devil's Canyon (1953) as Virgil Gates
- It Should Happen to You (1954) as Robert Grau
- Creature from the Black Lagoon (1954) as Dr. Edwin Thompson
- Riot in Cell Block 11 (1954) as Snader
- The Shanghai Story (1954) as Paul Grant
- The Caine Mutiny (1954) as Navy Psychiatrist Lieutenant Commander Dickson (uncredited)
- Three Hours to Kill (1954) as Deke
- Target Earth (1954) as Tom, Chief Research Scientist
- Masterson of Kansas (1954) as Joe the Poker Player winning against Doc Holliday (uncredited)
- The Atomic Kid (1954) as Dr. Edgar Pangborn
- The Big Combo (1955) as Doctor (scenes deleted)
- Not as a Stranger (1955) as Dr. Dietrich
- The Naked Street (1955) as District Attorney Blaker
- The Desperate Hours (1955) as FBI Agent Carson
- Trial (1955) as Sam Wiltse
- Shack Out on 101 (1955) as Eddie
- At Gunpoint (1955) as Clem Clark
- Science Fiction Theater (1955) Season 1, episode 37 "Sound of Murder"
- Science Fiction Theater (1956) Season 2, episode 4 "The Green Bomb", episode 30 "Dr. Robot"
- Invasion of the Body Snatchers (1956) as Dr. Hill (uncredited)
- The Proud Ones (1956) as Mr. Sam Bolton
- Dakota Incident (1956) as Mark Chester
- Man from Del Rio (1956) as Breezy Morgan
- Sneak Preview (1956) (S1:E2, "The Merry-Go-Round")
- The Young Stranger (1957) as Grubbs, Theater Manager
- Gunfight at the O.K. Corral (1957) as John P. Clum
- I Was a Teenage Werewolf (1957) as Dr. Alfred Brandon
- Johnny Tremain (1957) as Josiah Quincy
- The Wayward Girl (1957) as Ira Molson
- The Tall Stranger (1957) as Adam Judson
- Mr. Adams and Eve (1957) (Season 1 Episode 9: "The Business Manager") as Manager
- I Was a Teenage Frankenstein (1957) as Professor Frankenstein
- Cheyenne (1957) (S2:E20, "The Broken Pledge") as General George Custer
- Have Gun - Will Travel (1957) (Episode: No Visitors) as Mr. Jonas, store owner
- Perry Mason (1957–1965) (4 episodes)
  - (1957) (Episode: "The Case of the Crooked Candle") as Larry Sands
  - (1960) (Episode: "The Case of the Lavender Lipstick") as Max Pompey
  - (1964) (Episode: "The Case of the Nautical Knot") as Laurence Barlow
  - (1965) (Episode: "The Case of the Carefree Coronary") as Dennison Groody
- Gang War (1958) as Mark (scenes deleted)
- Colgate Theatre (1958) (Season 1 Episode 4: "Mr. Tutt" or "Strange Counsel")
- The Defiant Ones (1958) as Lou Gans
- The Black Orchid (1958) as Mr. Harmon
- Monster on the Campus (1958) as Dr. Oliver Cole
- The Rifleman (1959) S2 E1 "The Patsy" as Sam Barrows
- No Name on the Bullet (1959) as Pierce
- Warlock (1959) as Petrix
- Never So Few (1959) as Captain Alofson, Psychiatrist
- The Untouchables (1959) (Season 1 Episode 11: "You Can't Pick the Number") as Pat Danning
- The Time Machine (1960) as Walter Kemp
- The Magnificent Seven (1960) as Chamlee the Undertaker
- The Tom Ewell Show (1961) (Season 1 Episode 12: "Advice to the Lovelorn") as Harry Burton
- Alfred Hitchcock Presents (1962) (Season 7 Episode 21: "Burglar Proof") as Mr. Bliss
- Birdman of Alcatraz (1962) as Dr. Ellis
- Hemingway's Adventures of a Young Man (1962) as Ludstrum (scenes deleted)
- The Manchurian Candidate (1962) as Medical Officer (uncredited)
- The Virginian (1963-1965) (3 episodes)
  - (1963) (Season 1 Episode 30: "The Final Hour") as Burns
  - (1964) (Season 2 Episode 27: "The Long Quest") as Andrew Cass
  - (1964) (Season 3 Episode 10: "Return a Stranger") as Whit Parsons
- Spencer's Mountain (1963) as Dr. Campbell
- Hud (1963) as Mr. Burris
- The Alfred Hitchcock Hour (1964) (Season 2 Episode 22: "Behind the Locked Door") as Adam Driscott
- Seven Days in May (1964) as Senator Frederick Prentice
- Advance to the Rear (1964) as Captain Queeg
- Where Love Has Gone (1964) as Professor Bell
- The Hallelujah Trail (1965) as Hobbs
- Fluffy (1965) as Dr. Braden
- I Dream of Jeannie (1966) (Season 2 Episode 7: "The Fastest Gun in the East") as Horace Sedgwick
- The Time Tunnel (1966–1967) (30 episodes) as Lieutenant General Heywood Kirk
- A Covenant with Death (1967) as Bruce Donnelly
- The Invaders (1967) (Season 2 Episode 8: "Dark Outpost") as Colonel Harris
- Star Trek: The Original Series (1967) (Season 2 Episode 15: "The Trouble with Tribbles") as Station Manager Lurry
- 5 Card Stud (1968) as Dr. Cooper
- Once You Kiss a Stranger (1969) as Dr. Haggis
- Airport (1970) as Mr. Davidson
- Justin Morgan Had a Horse (1972) as Mr. Mays
- The Salzburg Connection (1972) as Jim Newhart
- Pete 'n' Tillie (1972) as Minister
- Soylent Green (1973) as Governor Santini
- Barnaby Jones (1973) as Mr. Bantree
- Cannon (1973) as Warden Sheppard
- Psychic Killer (1975) as Dr. Paul Taylor
- Flood! (1976) as Dr. Ted Horne
- The Lincoln Conspiracy (1977) as Senator John Conness
- The Last of the Mohicans (1977) (TV Movie) as General Webb
- Casey's Shadow (1978) as Dr. Williamson
- The Time Machine (1978) (TV Movie) as Ralph Branly
