= World Without End (film) =

1956 film by Edward Bernds

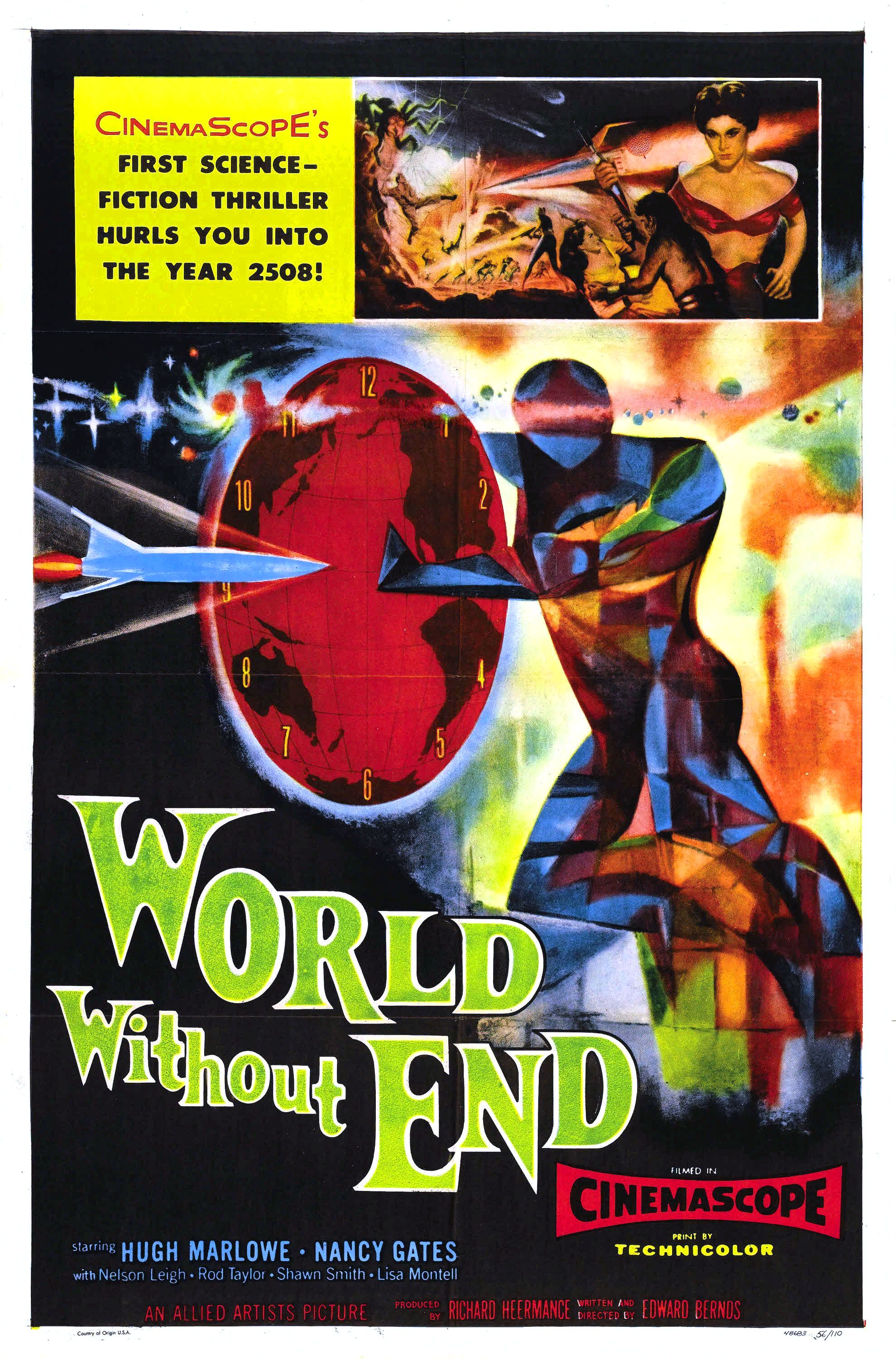
- Theatrical release poster by Reynold Brown
- Directed by: Edward Bernds
- Screenplay by: Edward Bernds
- Story by: Edward Bernds
- Produced by: Richard Heermance
- Starring: Hugh Marlowe; Nancy Gates; Rod Taylor; Paul Brinegar; Nelson Leigh
- Cinematography: Ellsworth Fredricks
- Edited by: Eda Warren
- Music by: Leith Stevens
- Production company: Allied Artists Pictures Corporation
- Distributed by: Allied Artists Pictures Corporation
- Release date: March 25, 1956
- Running time: 80 minutes
- Country: United States
- Language: English

World Without End (also known as Flight to the Future) is a 1956 American science fiction film directed by Edward Bernds and starring Hugh Marlowe and Nancy Gates. It was made in CinemaScope and Technicolor by Allied Artists and produced by Richard Heermance.

World Without End features an early screen role for Australian-born Rod Taylor. The film was distributed on a double feature with the Lon Chaney Jr. film Indestructible Man.

== Plot ==
In March 1957, commander Dr. Eldon Galbraithe, engineer Henry Jaffe, radioman Herbert Ellis and scientist John Borden, are returning to Earth from the first spaceflight, a reconnaissance trip around Mars. Suddenly, their spaceship is somehow accelerated to incredible velocities, and they are knocked unconscious. Their ship crash lands on a snow-covered mountain. When they venture out, they discover that they have become victims of time dilation and are now in the future.

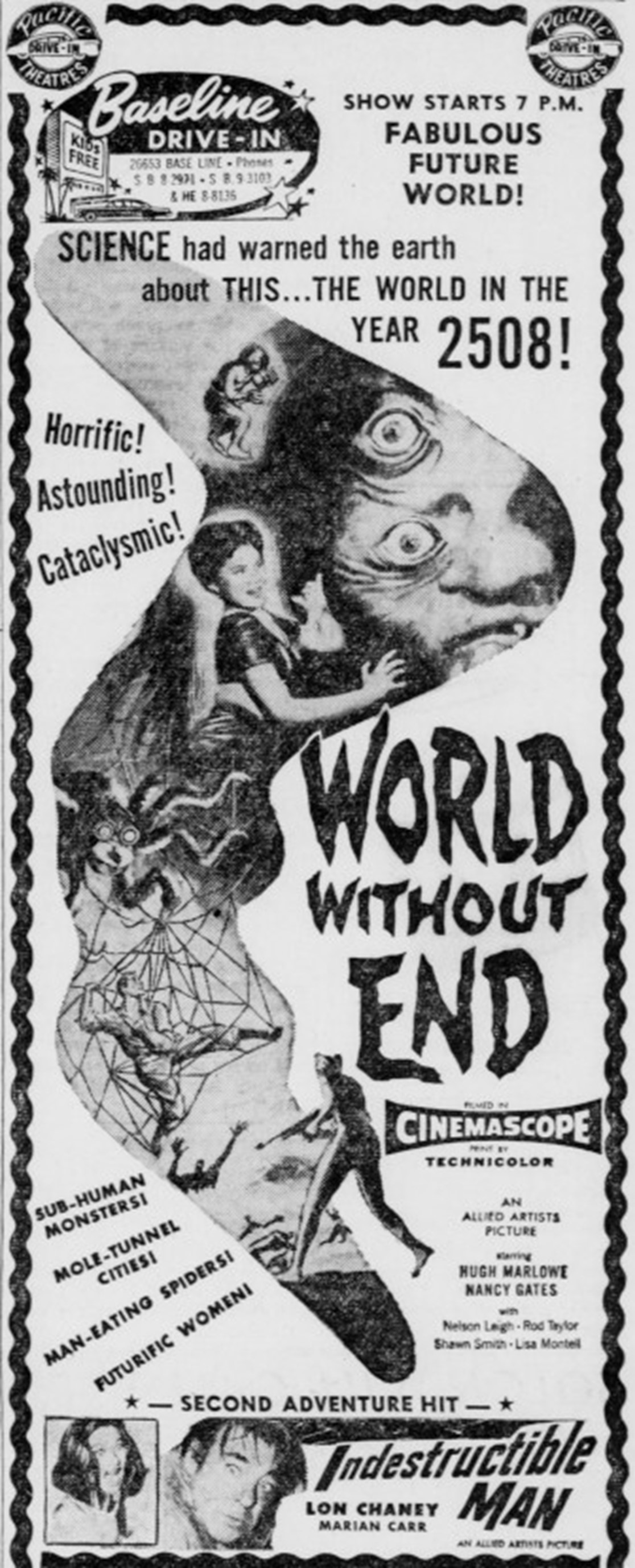
Drive-in advertisement from 1956 for World Without End and co-feature, Indestructible Man.

They theorize, from seeing time-worn gravestones and after their ship's instruments register heightened residual radiation, that a devastating atomic war had broken out in 2188, and that they are at least 200 years past that date. (They later learn that the year is 2508). Jaffe is particularly hard hit, as he realizes that his wife and children have long since died.

After surviving an ambush by giant, mutant spiders, they are attacked by one of the two remnants of human society. The "mutates" (as the astronauts label them) are violent, primitive surface dwellers. They have mutated due to generations of exposure to heightened radioactivity. (However, the background radiation has decreased to tolerable levels, and the men later learn that normal humans are often born to the mutates. These, however, are enslaved.)

Seeking shelter from the attacking mutates in a cave, the four men discover the entrance to an underground city, whose residents are the descendants of those who fled there from the atomic war. These people live in a high-tech, sophisticated culture. They are a peaceful group led by Timmek, the president of the ruling council. Underground, the men have grown less virile, and there are fewer and fewer children born each generation. In contrast, the women remain physically fertile (and ready for romance). Elaine admires a shirtless Herbert Ellis, commenting that the astronauts are "more muscular than our men". Deena, rescued from the surface as a child, falls in love with Ellis.

The astronauts try to persuade the underground people to arm themselves and reclaim the surface, but they are content with their comfortable existence.

When Timmek's daughter Garnet shows she is attracted to John Borden, Mories, an already hostile member of the council, becomes jealous. He retrieves the astronauts' confiscated pistols, but has to kill a man when he is caught in the act. Mories plants the guns in the astronauts' quarters. Finding the weapons, Timmek orders the astronauts expelled, but Deena testifies that she saw Mories hide the guns. Mories flees to the surface, where he is killed by mutates.

With Timmek now cooperative, the astronauts manufacture a bazooka and head back to the surface. Fleeing the deadly bazooka fire, the mutates take shelter in caves. Borden offers to fight their chief, Naga, in single combat for leadership of the mutates after Naga threatens to slaughter the unmutated slaves. Borden slays Naga and orders the remaining deformed mutates to leave. The astronauts then establish a thriving settlement, including members of both groups.

== Cast ==
- Hugh Marlowe as Borden
- Nancy Gates as Garnet
- Nelson Leigh as Galbraithe
- Rod Taylor as Ellis
- Lisa Montell as Deena
- Christopher Dark as Jaffe
- Booth Colman as Mories
- Everett Glass as Timmek
- Shawn Smith as Elaine
- Stanley Fraser as Elda
- William Vedder
- Rankin Mansfield
- Ricky Simpson

== Production ==
Under the working title, Flight to the Future, principal photography took place from July 19 to early August 1955. Locations included the Iverson Movie Ranch in Chatsworth, California.

Edward Bernds was a prolific director with experience in both television and cinema, and worked in many different genres. In 1956, he also helmed the comedy Navy Wife and crime thriller Calling Homicide. In directing World Without End, Bernds "crammed" in order to make a science fiction film. He studied Albert Einstein's theory of relativity to give his space and time travellers a plausible way to go into the future.

World Without End was partly made in order to reuse footage and costumes from the earlier Allied Artists science fiction film Flight to Mars (1951). A number of people who worked on the film went on to have notable film careers, including Sam Peckinpah (dialogue director) and Walter Mirisch (an executive at Allied Artists). Alberto Vargas (set sketches) was a famed artist whose only screen credit was World Without End. (Note: Joaquin Alberto Vargas y Chávez was a world famous painter of pin-up girls known as "Vargas Girls" that appeared in Esquire and Playboy magazines.)

== Reception ==
World Without End was "sufficiently successful" and drew attention from the estate of H.G. Wells. The similarities to The Time Machine (1895) led to a threatened lawsuit. The plot of World Without End was later repeated in other films, The Mole People (1956), The Time Travelers (1964), and Planet of the Apes (1968). Rod Taylor would later star in George Pal's The Time Machine (1960), an adaptation of the H.G. Wells novel.

As a "B" movie, World Without End received few critical reviews, although one reviewer commented that the appearance of a shirtless Rod Taylor, contains "... the best bit of beefcake in the entire genre". In a later 1986 interview in Starlog magazine, Taylor recalled: "I was so thrilled to have a sizable role in an American movie. It gave me the confidence to know that I could work with established Hollywood professionals and come out maybe equally as well." The director was taken with the enthusiasm of his fifth-credited actor, who literally threw himself into the role (struggling with a mutant spider).

== See also ==
- List of American films of 1956
