= Tim Baar =

American special effects artist

- Born: December 27, 1912; Chicago, Illinois, USA
- Died: March 9, 1977 (aged 64); Los Angeles, California, USA
- Other name: Tim Barr
- Occupation: Special effect artist
- Years active: 1942–1975

Tim Baar (December 27, 1912 – March 9, 1977) was an American special effects artist who won at the 33rd Academy Awards for Best Special Effects for the film The Time Machine. His Oscar was shared with Gene Warren.

He also did special effects on the TV show H.R. Pufnstuf.

== Filmography ==
- The Mummy's Tomb (1942)
- Flesh and Fantasy (1943)
- Phantom of the Opera (1943)
- When Worlds Collide (1951)
- The Ten Commandments (1956)
- Dinosaurus! (1960)
- The Time Machine (1960)
- Master of the World (1961)
- Jack the Giant Killer (1962)
- The Wonderful World of the Brothers Grimm (1962)
- 7 Faces of Dr. Lao (1964)
- The Horse in the Gray Flannel Suit (1968)
- Beware! The Blob! (1972)
- Jaws (1975)
