= Rod Taylor =

Australian actor (1930–2015)

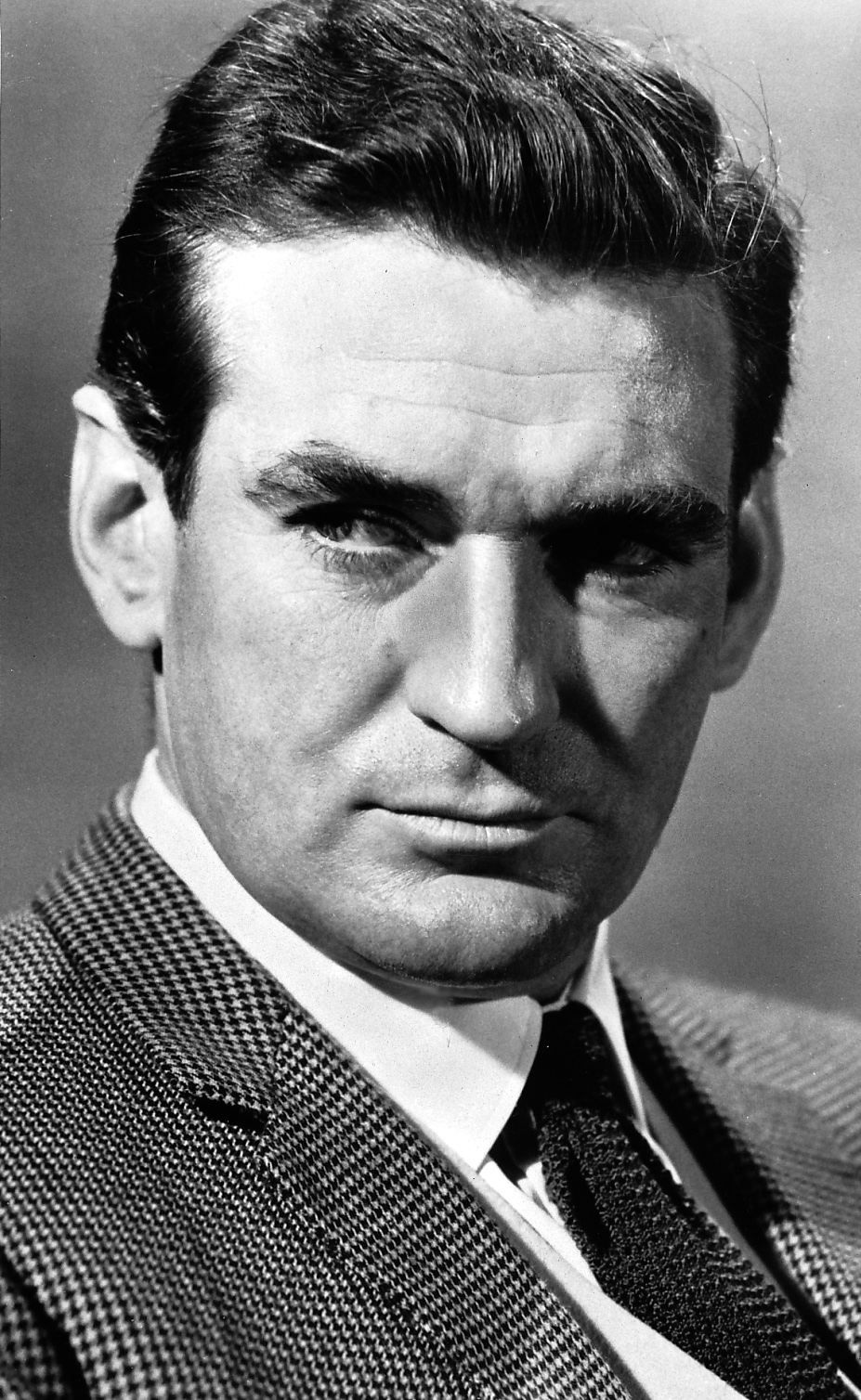
- Taylor in The V.I.P.s (1963)
- Born: Rodney Sturt Taylor; 11 January 1930; Lidcombe, New South Wales, Australia
- Died: 7 January 2015 (aged 84); Beverly Hills, California, US
- Resting place: Forest Lawn Memorial Park, Hollywood Hills, California, US
- Education: University of New South Wales
- Occupation: Actor
- Years active: 1950–2009
- Spouses: Peggy Williams (m. 1951; div. 1954) Mary Hilem (m. 1963; div. 1969) Carol Kikumura (m. 1980)
- Children: Felicia Taylor
- Website: rodtaylorblog.com

Rodney Sturt Taylor (11 January 1930 – 7 January 2015) was an Australian actor. He appeared in more than 50 feature films, including Young Cassidy (1965), Nobody Runs Forever (1968), The Train Robbers (1973), and A Matter of Wife... and Death (1975).

Taylor was born in Lidcombe, a suburb of Sydney, to a father who was a steel construction contractor and commercial artist and a mother who was a children's author. He began taking art classes in high school, and continued in college. He decided to become an actor after seeing Laurence Olivier in an Old Vic touring production of Richard III.

His first film role was in a re-enactment of Charles Sturt's voyage down the Murrumbidgee and Murray rivers, playing Sturt's offsider, George Macleay. At the time, he was also appearing in a number of theatre productions for Australia's Mercury Theatre. He made his feature film debut in the Australian Lee Robinson film King of the Coral Sea (1954). He soon started acting in television films, portraying several different characters in the 1950s anthology series Studio 57.

He started to gain popularity after starring in The Time Machine (1960), as H. George Wells. He later starred in the Disney film One Hundred and One Dalmatians (1961), voicing Pongo. In one of his most famous roles, he played Mitch Brenner in The Birds (1963), directed by Alfred Hitchcock. By the late 1990s, Taylor had moved into semiretirement. His final film role was in Quentin Tarantino's Inglourious Basterds (2009), portraying Winston Churchill in a cameo.

== Early life ==
Taylor was born on 11 January 1930 in Lidcombe, a suburb of Sydney, the only child of William Sturt Taylor, a steel construction contractor and commercial artist, and Mona Taylor (née Thompson), a writer of more than a hundred short stories and children's books. His middle name comes from his great-great-granduncle, Captain Charles Sturt, a British explorer of the Australian outback in the 19th century.

Taylor attended Parramatta High School and later studied at the East Sydney Technical and Fine Arts College and took art classes. His mother wanted him to be an artist, and pressured him into taking the art classes. While at the tech he met young potter David Boyd and with their respective companions began a pottery concern. For a time he worked as a commercial artist, but caught the acting bug when he saw Laurence Olivier in an Old Vic touring production of Richard III.

== Career ==
=== Australia ===
Taylor acquired extensive radio and stage experience in Australia, where his radio work included a period in the historic run of Blue Hills, the daytime soaps and a role as a vocally convincing Tarzan. Earlier in his career, he had to support himself by working at Sydney's Mark Foy's department store, designing and painting window and other displays during the day. But his radio work was soon at the forefront of his life, making a great impact playing Douglas Bader in a series to dramatize the narrative of Paul Brickhill's biography Reach for the Sky. In 1951, he took part in a re-enactment of Charles Sturt's voyage down the Murrumbidgee and Murray Rivers, playing Sturt's offsider, George Macleay. A short documentary, Inland with Sturt (1951), was based on it. Taylor also appeared in a number of theatre productions for Australia's Mercury Theatre.

Taylor made his feature-film debut in the Australian Lee Robinson film King of the Coral Sea (1954), playing an American. He later played Israel Hands in a Hollywood-financed film shot in Sydney, Long John Silver (1954), an unofficial sequel to Treasure Island. Following these two films, Taylor was awarded the 1954 Rola Show Australian Radio Actor of the Year Award, which included a ticket to London via Los Angeles, but Taylor did not continue on to London.

=== Hollywood ===
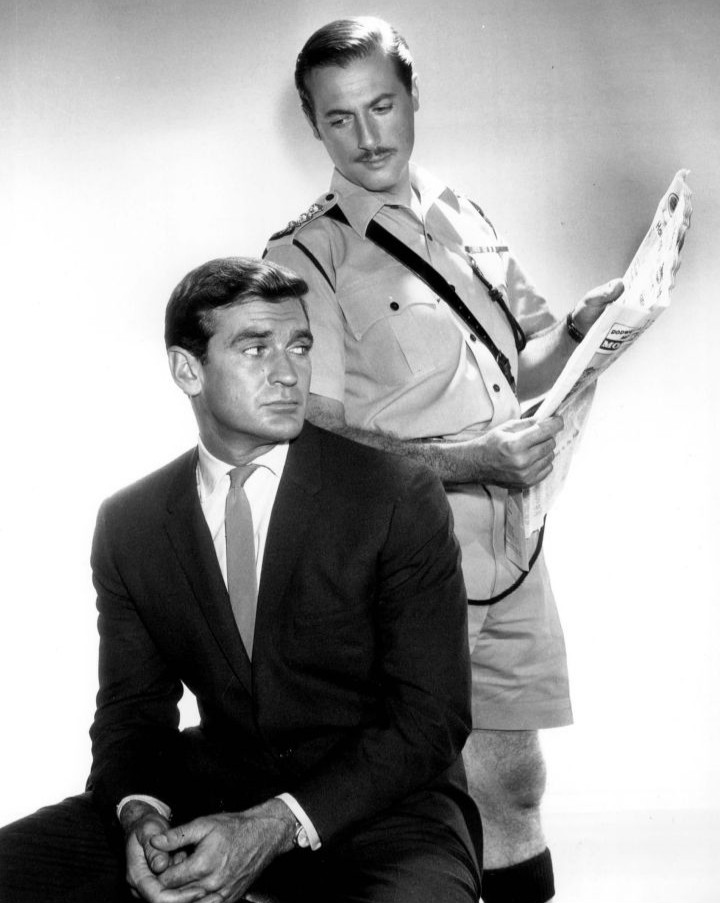
Taylor (seated) with Lloyd Bochner in the television series Hong Kong (1961)

Taylor soon landed roles in television shows such as Studio 57 and the films Hell on Frisco Bay (1955) and Giant (1956). In 1955, he guest-starred as Clancy in the third episode ("The Argonauts") of the first hour-long Western television series, Cheyenne, an ABC program starring Clint Walker.

Toward the end of 1955, Taylor unsuccessfully screen tested to play boxer Rocky Graziano in Metro-Goldwyn-Mayer's Somebody Up There Likes Me after James Dean's death, but his use of a Brooklyn accent and physical prowess in the test impressed the studio enough to give him a long-term contract. At MGM, he played a series of supporting roles in The Catered Affair (1956), Raintree County (1957), and Ask Any Girl (1959). He had a significant role in Separate Tables (1958), which won Oscars for two of its stars, David Niven and Wendy Hiller. He also made a strong impression guest-starring in an episode of The Twilight Zone titled "And When the Sky Was Opened" (1959).

=== Stardom ===
Taylor's first leading role in a feature film was in The Time Machine (1960), George Pal's adaptation of the science-fiction classic by H. G. Wells, with Taylor as the time traveller who, thousands of years in the future, falls for a woman played by Yvette Mimieux. Taylor played a character not unlike that of his Twilight Zone episode of a year earlier and the film World Without End in 1956.

In or around 1960, he was approached regarding the role of James Bond in the first feature-length Bond film. Taylor reportedly declined to become involved because he considered the character of Bond "beneath him". Taylor later commented: "Every time a new Bond picture became a smash hit ... I tore out my hair."

Taylor starred in Alfred Hitchcock's horror thriller The Birds (1963), along with Tippi Hedren, Suzanne Pleshette, Jessica Tandy, and Veronica Cartwright, playing a man whose town and home come under attack by menacing birds. Taylor then starred with Jane Fonda in the romantic comedy Sunday in New York (also 1963).

During the mid-1960s, Taylor worked mostly for MGM. His credits including The V.I.P.s (1963), his first feature-film role as an Australian, with Richard Burton, Elizabeth Taylor, and Maggie Smith; Fate Is the Hunter (for 20th Century Fox, 1964) with Glenn Ford and Suzanne Pleshette; 36 Hours (1964) with James Garner; Young Cassidy (1965) with Julie Christie and Maggie Smith; The Liquidator (1965) with Jill St. John; Do Not Disturb (1965); and The Glass Bottom Boat (1966), both co-starring Doris Day.

He began to change his image toward the end of the decade to more tough-guy roles, such as Chuka (1967), which he also produced, and he starred in Hotel (1967) with Catherine Spaak; Dark of the Sun (or The Mercenaries, 1968), again with Yvette Mimieux; Nobody Runs Forever (1968) in which he played New South Wales Police Sergeant Scobie Malone, this being Taylor's first starring feature-film role as an Australian; and Darker than Amber (1970) as Travis McGee.

He was also reportedly up for the role of martial artist Roper in the Bruce Lee vehicle Enter the Dragon (1973). The film was directed by Robert Clouse, who had also directed Taylor in Darker than Amber. Taylor was supposedly deemed too tall for the part, and the role instead went to John Saxon.

=== Later career ===
In 1973, Taylor was cast in The Train Robbers alongside long-time friend John Wayne and Ann-Margret. The film was a box-office success. Taylor also had some television roles: he starred in Bearcats! (1971) on CBS and in The Oregon Trail (1976) on NBC. He had a regular role in the short-lived spy drama series Masquerade (1983), and played one of the leads in the equally short-lived series, Outlaws (1986). From 1988 to 1990, Taylor appeared in the CBS drama series Falcon Crest as Frank Agretti, playing opposite Jane Wyman. In the mid-1990s, he appeared in several episodes of Murder, She Wrote and Walker, Texas Ranger.

In 1993, he hosted the documentary Time Machine: The Journey Back. The special ended with a minisequel written by David Duncan, the screenwriter of the George Pal film. Taylor recreated his role as George, reuniting him with Filby (Alan Young).

Taylor returned to Australia several times over the years to make films, playing a 1920s traveling showman in The Picture Show Man (1977) and a paid killer in On the Run (1983). In the black comedy Welcome to Woop Woop (1997), he played the foul-mouthed redneck Daddy-O.

By the late 1990s, Taylor had moved into semiretirement. In 2007, he appeared in the horror telemovie Kaw, which revisits the idea of marauding birds turning on their human tormentors. In this film, however, the cause of the disturbance was discovered by Taylor, who plays the town doctor. He appeared in Quentin Tarantino's Inglourious Basterds in 2009, portraying Winston Churchill in a cameo. In 2017, a documentary on Taylor's life, Pulling No Punches, was released and entered into the Beverly Hills Film Festival.

== Personal life ==
His first wife was model Peggy Williams (1951–1954). They divorced after allegations of domestic violence. Taylor later claimed that they divorced because they felt they were too young to have a healthy marriage. Taylor dated and was briefly engaged to Swedish actress Anita Ekberg in the early 1960s. He dated model Pat Sheehan in the late 1960s.

His second marriage, to model Mary Hilem, lasted from 1963 until they divorced in 1969. The couple had one daughter, former CNN financial reporter Felicia Taylor (1964-2023). Taylor bought a home in Palm Springs, California, in 1967.

He married his third wife, Carol Kikumura, in 1980. They had originally dated in the early 1960s when she was an extra on his TV series Hong Kong. The couple got back together in 1971 and dated for an additional nine years before marrying.

== Death ==
Taylor died of a heart attack at his home, surrounded by his family, on 7 January 2015, in Beverly Hills, California, four days before his 85th birthday.

== Filmography ==
=== Feature films ===
Year	Title	Role(s)	Notes		
Year	Title	1954	King of the Coral Sea	Jack Janiero	Film debut
Long John Silver	Israel Hands	1954			
1955	The Virgin Queen	Cpl. Gwilym	Uncredited		
1955	Top Gun	Lem Sutter			
1956	Hell on Frisco Bay	John Brodie Evans			
1956	World Without End	Herbert Ellis			
1956	The Catered Affair	Ralph Halloran			
1956	Giant	Sir David Karfrey			
1956	The Rack	Al	Uncredited		
1957	Raintree County	Garwood B. Jones			
1958	Step Down to Terror	Mike Randall			
1958	Separate Tables	Charles			
1959	Ask Any Girl	Ross Tayford			
1960	The Time Machine	H. George Wells			
1960	Colossus and the Amazon Queen	Pirro			
1961	One Hundred and One Dalmatians	Pongo	Voice role		
1962	Seven Seas to Calais	Francis Drake			
1963	The Birds	Mitch Brenner			
1963	The V.I.P.s	Les Mangrum			
1963	A Gathering of Eagles	Col. Hollis Farr			
1963	Sunday in New York	Mike Mitchell			
1964	Fate Is the Hunter	Capt. Jack Savage			
1965	36 Hours	Maj. Walter Gerber			
1965	Young Cassidy	John Cassidy			
1965	The Liquidator	Boysie Oakes			
1965	Do Not Disturb	Mike Harper			
1966	The Glass Bottom Boat	Bruce Templeton			
1967	Hotel	Peter McDermott			
1967	Chuka	Chuka			
1968	Dark of the Sun	Capt. Bruce Curry			
1968	Nobody Runs Forever	Scobie Malone	a.k.a. The High Commissioner		
1968	The Hell with Heroes	Brynie MacKay			
1970	Zabriskie Point	Lee Allen			
1970	Darker than Amber	Travis McGee			
1970	The Man Who Had Power Over Women	Peter Reaney			
1971	Powderkeg	Hank Brackett	TV movie/pilot for Bearcats!		
1972	Family Flight	Jason Carlyle	TV movie		
1973	The Train Robbers	Grady			
1973	Gli eroi	Lieutenant Bob Robson	a.k.a. The Heroes		
1973	Trader Horn	Trader Horn			
1973	The Deadly Trackers	Frank Brand			
1974	Hell River	Marko	a.k.a. Partizani		
1975	A Matter of Wife... and Death	Shamus McCoy	TV movie		
1976	Blondie	Christopher Tauling			
1976	The Oregon Trail	Evan Thorpe	TV series		
1977	Gulliver's Travels	Reldresal / King of Blefuscu	Voice, uncredited		
1977	The Picture Show Man	Palmer			
1979	The Treasure Seekers	Marian Casey			
1980	Cry of the Innocent	Steve Donegin	TV movie		
1981	Jacqueline Bouvier Kennedy	'Black Jack' Bouvier	TV movie		
1982	Charles & Diana: A Royal Love Story	Edward Adeane	TV movie		
1982	A Time to Die	Jack Bailey			
1982	On the Run	Mr. Payatta			
1984	Terror in the Aisles	Himself (stock footage)			
1985	Marbella, un golpe de cinco estrellas	Commander			
1985	Half Nelson		TV series		
1985	Mask of Murder	Supt. Bob McLaine			
1991	Danielle Steel's 'Palomino'	Bill King	TV movie		
1992	Grass Roots	Gen. Willoughby	TV movie		
1995	Open Season	Billy Patrick			
1995	Point of Betrayal	Ted Kitteridge			
1997	Welcome to Woop Woop	Daddy-O			
1998	The Warlord: Battle for the Galaxy	General Sorenson	TV movie		
2007	Kaw	Doc	TV movie		
2009	Inglourious Basterds	Winston Churchill	Final film role		

=== Documentaries ===
- Inland with Sturt (1951) as George Mcleady
- The Fantasy Film Worlds of George Pal (1985)
- Time Machine: The Journey Back (1993)
- All About the Birds (2000)
- Not Quite Hollywood (2008)
- Pulling No Punches (2016)

== Television ==
=== As a regular ===
Taylor had several lead roles in television, from the early 1960s to the early first decade of the 21st century. Among his television shows as a regular are:

- Hong Kong with co-star Lloyd Bochner (1960, ABC)
- Bearcats! (1971, CBS)
- The Oregon Trail as Evan Thorpe, a widower taking his three children from their Illinois farm to the Pacific Northwest by way of the Oregon Trail (1977, NBC)
- Masquerade (1983)
- Outlaws (1986)

=== Guest appearances ===
- Studio 57 (1955) – "The Last Day on Earth", "The Black Sheep's Daughter"
- Lux Video Theatre (1955) – "Dark Tribute", "The Browning Version"
- Cheyenne (1955) – "The Argonauts"
- Suspicion (1957) – "The Story of Marjorie Reardon"
- Schlitz Playhouse of Stars (1958) – "A Thing to Fight For"
- Studio One (1958) – "Image of Fear"
- Lux Playhouse (1958) – "The Best House in the Valley"
- Playhouse 90 (1958–59) – "Verdict of Three", "The Long March", The Great Gatsby, "The Raider", "Misalliance"
- The Twilight Zone (1959) – "And When the Sky Was Opened"
- Dick Powell's Zane Grey Theatre (1960) – "Picture of Sal"
- Goodyear Theatre (1960) – "Capital Gains"
- General Electric Theater (1960) – "Early to Die", "The Young Years"
- Westinghouse Desilu Playhouse (1960) – "Thunder in the Night"
- Bus Stop (1961) – "Portrait of a Hero"
- The DuPont Show of the Week (1962) – "The Ordeal of Dr. Shannon"
- Tales of the Unexpected (TV series) (1980) – "The Hitch-Hiker"
- Falcon Crest (1988–1990) as Frank Agretti
- Murder, She Wrote (1995) – "Another Killing in Cork", "Nan's Ghost Parts 1 and 2"
- Walker, Texas Ranger (1996–1997, 2000) – "Redemption", "Texas vs. Cahill", "Wedding Bells"

== Theatre credits ==
- Julius Caesar by William Shakespeare (Independent, 1950)
- Home of the Brave by Arthur Laurents (Independent, 1950)
- Misalliance by George Bernard Shaw (John Alden Company, 1951)
- Twins by Plautus (Mercury, 1952)
- The Comedy of Errors by William Shakespeare (Mercury, 1952)
- The Witch by John Masefield (Mercury, 1952)
- They Knew What They Wanted by Sidney Howard (Mercury, 1952)
- The Happy Time by Samuel A. Taylor (Mercury, 1953)
