= The Fantasy Film Worlds of George Pal =

1985 documentary film by Arnold Leibovit

- DVD cover
- Directed by: Arnold Leibovit
- Written by: Arnold Leibovit
- Produced by: Arnold Leibovit
- Starring: Robert Bloch; Chesley Bonestell; Ray Bradbury; Wah Chang; Tony Curtis; Jim Danforth; Joe Dante; Roy Edward Disney; Barbara Eden; Paul Frees; Duke Goldstone; Gae Griffith; Ray Harryhausen; Charlton Heston; Walter Lantz; Janet Leigh; Albert Nozaki; David Pal; Tony Randall; Ann Robinson; Gene Roddenberry; Russ Tamblyn; Rod Taylor; William Tuttle; Gene Warren; Robert Wise; Alan Young; Ward Kimball; Yvette Mimieux; George Pal
- Edited by: Arnold Leibovit
- Distributed by: Arnold Leibovit Entertainment
- Release date: 1985
- Running time: 93 minutes
- Country: United States
- Language: English

The Fantasy Film Worlds of George Pal is a 1985 American documentary film about Academy Award-winning producer/director George Pal. It was written, directed, and produced by Arnold Leibovit.

== Summary ==
The film follows Pal's career, beginning with his early life in Hungary and Germany, and covering his progression from cartoon artist to creator of stop-motion animated short films (known as Puppetoons) to full-length feature motion pictures. Pal was a visionary and innovator in the world of motion pictures, especially in the area of stop motion animation, which he pioneered. His work earned him seven Academy Award nominations along with an Honorary Award while serving as an inspiration for Gene Roddenberry, Steven Spielberg and George Lucas, among others. The film includes interviews with Pal's cast members, crew, and peers, as well as Pal himself.

== Release ==
The film premiered at the Academy of Motion Pictures Arts and Sciences as part of the annual "George Pal Lecture on Fantasy in Film". It was also released on DVD on August 29, 2000.

== Cast ==
- Robert Bloch
- Chesley Bonestell
- Ray Bradbury
- Wah Chang
- Tony Curtis
- Jim Danforth
- Joe Dante
- Roy Edward Disney
- Barbara Eden
- Paul Frees (narrator of the film)
- Duke Goldstone
- Gae Griffith
- Ray Harryhausen
- Charlton Heston
- Walter Lantz
- Janet Leigh
- Albert Nozaki
- David Pal
- Tony Randall
- Ann Robinson
- Gene Roddenberry
- Russ Tamblyn
- Rod Taylor
- William Tuttle
- Gene Warren
- Robert Wise
- Alan Young
- Ward Kimball
- Yvette Mimieux
- George Pal
