= Tom Thumb (film) =

1958 film by George Pal

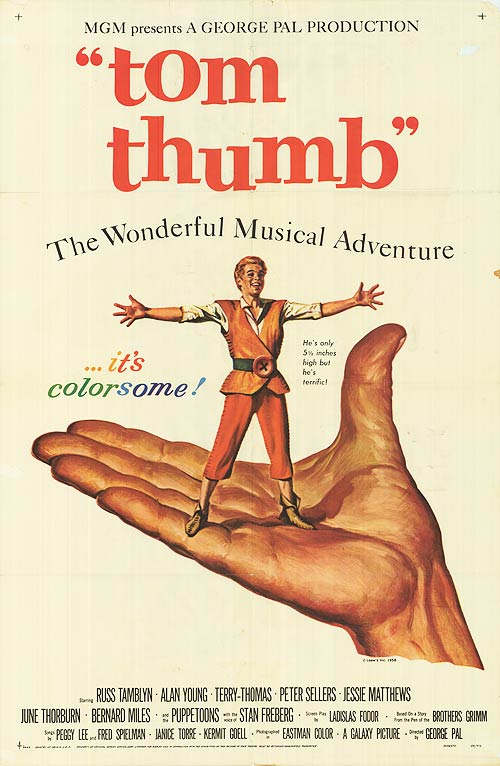
- Theatrical release poster by Reynold Brown
- Directed by: George Pal
- Screenplay by: Ladislas Fodor
- Based on: Daumesdick (Thumbling); 1812 fairy tale by Jacob Grimm; Wilhelm Grimm
- Produced by: George Pal
- Starring: Russ Tamblyn; Alan Young; Terry-Thomas; Peter Sellers; Jessie Matthews; June Thorburn; Bernard Miles; The Puppetoons; Stan Freberg
- Cinematography: Georges Périnal
- Edited by: Frank Clarke
- Music by: Douglas Gamley; Ken Jones
- Production company: Galaxy Pictures
- Distributed by: Metro-Goldwyn-Mayer
- Release dates: 3 December 1958 (London); 22 December 1958 (United States)
- Running time: 98 minutes
- Country: United Kingdom
- Language: English
- Budget: $909,000
- Box office: $3.25 million

Tom Thumb (stylised as tom thumb) is a 1958 British musical fantasy film produced and directed by George Pal, and released by MGM. The film, based on the fairy tale "Thumbling" by the Brothers Grimm, is about a tiny youth who manages to outwit two thieves determined to make a fortune from him.

Starring Russ Tamblyn in the title role, the film features a largely British supporting cast (it was filmed in both Hollywood and London), including Bernard Miles and Jessie Matthews as Tom's adoptive parents, June Thorburn as the Forest Queen, and comic actors Terry-Thomas and Peter Sellers as the villainous duo who try to exploit the tiny hero for profit.

Pal worked with cinematographer Georges Périnal, animators Wah Chang and Gene Warren, art director Elliot Scott and special effects artist Tom Howard to create the animated and fantasy sequences. Douglas Gamley and Ken Jones wrote the music, with lyrics by Peggy Lee.

The film is referenced in The Wonderful World of the Brothers Grimm (1962) and Pinkeltje (1978). The film is also featured in That's Dancing! (1985).

== Plot ==
Jonathan, a poor but honest woodcutter, lives in the forest with his loving wife Anne. One day, while chopping down a tree, the mystical Forest Queen appears before Jonathan and begs him to spare the tree as it is a home to a family of birds. As selling wood is his livelihood, Jonathan is initially reluctant, but after the Queen demonstrates her magic powers, Jonathan agrees. In gratitude, the Queen tells Jonathan she will grant Jonathan and his wife three wishes. Jonathan races home to tell Anne about the incredible encounter.

Unfortunately, Jonathan and Anne accidentally squander the wishes while bickering over dinner. As they turn in for bed that night, they look over the second bedroom of their cottage, which is fully stocked with toys for the child that they dearly wanted but were never able to have. Anne laments their previous squandering of their magic wishes, which they could have used to wish for a child, but Jonathan consoles her that the Forest Queen may yet show them kindness and grant them one more wish. Anne remarks that she would love any child that they would have had "even if he was no bigger than her thumb."

Later, they are roused by a soft knocking at the door and find before them a boy who is literally the size of a thumb, who addresses Jonathan and Anne familiarly as "Father" and "Mother". Anne instinctively knows that the boy's name is Tom.

The following morning, just before his new parents wake up, Tom performs a song-and-dance sequence amidst the birthday party thrown him by the toys (who magically come to life now that they have a child to play with). And, a few days after that, best-family-friend Woody takes Tom into town, where a carnival is being held. Tom is carried off by a balloon up to the top of the nearby castle's treasury tower, where two thieves, Ivan and Antony, are conspiring to steal the gold. They realize that due to his size, Tom will easily be able to slip between the bars of the grill on the treasury roof and trick him into believing that they need the gold to help poor orphans. As a reward for his assistance, Ivan gives Tom a single gold sovereign from the stolen loot. Tom returns home late at night, to find his parents distraught over his disappearance from the carnival. While he sneaks in through the window, he accidentally drops his sovereign into a cake that his mother has been baking.

By the next morning, the robbery has been discovered and guards are scouring the countryside searching for the thieves. A unit stops at Jonathan's cottage to ask if he or Anne have seen anyone suspicious in the area. Anne offers the guards some cake and one guard bites into the slice containing the sovereign, instantly recognizing it as part of the stolen treasure. Jonathan and Anne are wrongly accused of theft, arrested and taken away to be flogged in the town square.

With Woody's help, Tom tracks down the real thieves and, thanks to his ability to control animals, especially donkeys and horses, eventually manages to bring them back to the town square, along with their loot, thereby exonerating his parents. Ivan and Antony are arrested and the gold is returned to the treasury. The movie concludes with Woody marrying Queenie, whom he has been clumsily romancing throughout the movie and who has been transformed into a mortal by his long-awaited kiss.

== Cast ==
- Russ Tamblyn as Tom Thumb
- Alan Young as Woody
- Terry-Thomas as Ivan
- Peter Sellers as Antony
- June Thorburn as the Forest Queen
- Bernard Miles as Jonathan, Tom's Father
- Jessie Matthews as Anne, Tom's Mother
- Ian Wallace as the Cobbler
- Peter Butterworth as Kapellmeister
- Peter Bull as the Town Crier
- Stan Freberg as the voice of Yawning Man
- Dal McKennon as the voice of Con-Fu-Shon

== Production ==
=== Development ===
Pal said he had the idea to make a film out of Tom Thumb in the late 1940s when making Puppetoons for Paramount. In June 1947 he announced he would make the movie as his first feature, using a combination of actors, animation and animals. He signed a deal with United Artists to make the movie for a reported $2 million, with Woody Herman and Peggy Lee to star. Buddy Kaye and Sam Kiberg signed to make songs. In November, Pal was reported as filming Sierra backgrounds. In January 1948, Pal said Buster Keaton and Thomas Mitchell would appear in the film.

In May 1948, Pal announced he had hired Laslo Vadnay to make Miklos and the Dancing Bear. In October that year, Dick Haymes was announced for a lead role in Tom Thumb. Tom Neal signed to play Jan the Hunter. However, the project kept being delayed.

In October 1952, the film had still yet to be made. Pal said he wanted Laurel and Hardy to play the thieves.

Eventually, in June 1957, Pal signed a deal to make the film with MGM; he would use his company, Galaxy Productions, and the movie would be made in England. In November 1957, Pal announced he would direct as well as produce, and that Russ Tamblyn would star. MGM had mostly used Tamblyn in support roles, but promoted him to leads following Peyton Place.

British finance provided was £235,415, plus a dollar budget of $226,022.

=== Filming ===
Pal filmed scenes in England in early 1958, taking over every one of the seven sound stages at MGM's London studios, and using two crews. He moved his unit to Los Angeles in April 1958.

In November 1958, Pal announced plans to make three more Tom Thumb movies, each starring Tamblyn, to be released once a year.

== Soundtrack ==
- "Tom Thumb's Tune"
  - (uncredited)
  - Music and lyrics by Peggy Lee
  - Sung and danced by Russ Tamblyn and the Puppetoons
- "After All These Years"
  - (uncredited)
  - Music by Fred Spielman
  - Lyrics by Janice Torre
  - Sung by Jessie Matthews (dubbed by Norma Zimmer)
- "Talented Shoes"
  - (uncredited)
  - Music by Fred Spielman
  - Lyrics by Janice Torre
  - Sung by Ian Wallace
- "The Yawning Song"
  - (uncredited)
  - Music by Fred Spielman
  - Lyrics by Kermit Goell
  - Sung by Stan Freberg
- "Are You a Dream"
  - (uncredited)
  - Music and Lyrics by Peggy Lee
  - by Alan Young

== Release ==
The film had its world premiere at the Empire, Leicester Square in London on 3 December 1958, before opening to the public the following day.

== Reception ==
Variety wrote, "film is top-drawer, a comic fairy tale with music that stacks up alongside some of the Disney classics"; and Time called it "unusually fresh and appealing; it is kid stuff, but it will probably sell a lot of popcorn to the grownups, too."

=== Box office ===
The film was the 8th most popular movie at the British box office in 1959. According to Kinematograph Weekly, the film performed "better than average" at the British box office in 1959.

According to MGM records, the film earned $1,800,000 in the US and Canada and $1,450,000 elsewhere, making a profit of $612,000. The film also earned $200,000 from the Eady Levy.

In 1961, Pal said the film was a personal favorite because "it was a wholesome picture which made people smile, especially the children."

== Awards ==
At the 1959 Academy Awards, the film won an Oscar for Tom Howard in the category of Best Effects, Special Effects.

At the 1959 BAFTA Awards, Terry-Thomas was Nominated for a BAFTA Film Award in the category of Best British Actor.

At the 1959 Golden Globes, the film was nominated for Best Motion Picture – Musical.

At the 1959 Laurel Awards, the film was nominated for Top Musical, while Russ Tamblyn was nominated for a Golden Laurel for Top Male Musical Performance.

At the 1959 Writers Guild of America Ladislas Fodor was nominated for a WGA Award (Screen) for Best Written American Musical.

== Home media ==
Tom Thumb has been released as a DVD for all regions and to VHS.

== Comic book adaptation ==
- Dell Four Color #972 (January 1959)

== See also ==
- List of American films of 1958
- List of films featuring miniature people
