= Time Machine: The Journey Back =

1993 film directed by Clyde Lucas

- Directed by: Clyde Lucas
- Written by: Bunky Young; David Duncan
- Produced by: Clyde Lucas
- Starring: Rod Taylor; Gene Warren, Sr.; Wah Chang; Alan Young; Whit Bissell; Michael J. Fox
- Cinematography: 7th Voyage Productions Inc. Hazie Spiegel; Steven Spieldal
- Music by: Clyde Lucas; John Massari
- Distributed by: Turner Program Services(original); Warner Bros. (current)
- Release date: 1993
- Running time: 48 minutes
- Country: United States
- Language: English

Time Machine: The Journey Back is a combination documentary short-sequel to George Pal's 1960 film The Time Machine, hosted by Time Machine star Rod Taylor and produced and directed by Clyde Lucas. The film was produced in 1993 for airing on stations of the PBS network.

The film's first section is about the time machine prop from The Time Machine, not the film itself, and includes interviews with Academy Award-winner special effect creators Wah Chang and Gene Warren. In its second section, Michael J. Fox sits in the time machine prop and talks about his experience with the DeLorean sports car time machine from the 1985 film Back to the Future. In the film's final section (written by The Time Machine screenwriter David Duncan), Rod Taylor, Alan Young, and Whit Bissell reprise their roles from the original 1960 film.

== History ==
During filming of Time Machine: The Journey Back, Bob Burns III surprised director Clyde Lucas by having Gene Warren drop by. Warren, the award-winning effects creator for the original movie, consented to an on-air interview in which he discussed creating the special effects for the film. This led to an interview with one of Warren's partners, Wah Chang, in Northern California. Chang and Warren shared more details about creating the effects and how the little Time Machine prop was made.

Lucas contacted the original screenwriter, David Duncan, who agreed to write a mini-sequel to George Pal's classic. The mini-sequel featured Whit Bissell's last acting performance.

== The Time Machine "sequel" ==
The mini-sequel reunited George (Rod Taylor) with Filby (Alan Young) in a scene set during the first world War just before Filby (now a senior officer in the British Army) is to leave for France. George, knowing that Filby is destined to die on May 15, 1916, in a plane crash on the coast of France, attempts unsuccessfully to convince Filby to join him in time travel to the future instead, and mentions having spent many wonderful years with Weena the Eloi, but Filby refuses to join George in time travel, and then leaves. The scene ends with George alone meditating out loud about the possibility of travelling to the day before Filby's death in order to attempt a rescue again. Lucas first filmed Whit Bissell for the opening, recreating his role as George's friend and colleague Walter Kemp, this time in 1932, reminiscing about his friend, the inventor, whom no one has seen for 32 years.

== Awards ==
The film won a Saturn Award and a Telly Award. It was included as a "special feature" on the DVD for George Pal's film The Time Machine, released by Warner Bros. and was featured in Starlog Magazine.

In July 2014, Warner Bros. released both the film and the documentary on Blu-ray Disc.
