= Witness to Murder =

1954 film by Roy Rowland starring Barbara Stanwyck

- Theatrical release poster
- Directed by: Roy Rowland
- Screenplay by: Chester Erskine; Nunnally Johnson
- Produced by: Chester Erskine
- Starring: Barbara Stanwyck; George Sanders; Gary Merrill
- Cinematography: John Alton
- Edited by: Robert Swink
- Music by: Herschel Burke Gilbert
- Production company: Chester Erskine Productions
- Distributed by: United Artists
- Release date: April 15, 1954 (United States)
- Running time: 83 minutes
- Country: United States
- Language: English

Witness to Murder is a 1954 American film noir crime drama directed by Roy Rowland and starring Barbara Stanwyck, George Sanders, and Gary Merrill. While the film received moderately positive reviews, it ended up as an also-ran to Alfred Hitchcock's somewhat similar Rear Window, which opened less than a month later. The latter picture was a box-office hit.

== Plot ==
Cheryl Draper looks out of her bedroom window, and witnesses a young woman being strangled to death and reports it to the police, but when the killer, Albert Richter, sees detectives arriving downstairs, he moves the body. When the police show up to his door, Albert acts nonchalant, and, when no body is found, the police are convinced that Cheryl dreamed it up.

The next day, Albert puts the body in a trunk and leaves to dispose of it. While he is out, Cheryl notices that an apartment on the same floor is for rent, and she is given a tour by the building manager. She finds torn drapery, which Albert dubiously re-ripped in front of the police, and a pair of earrings. Albert returns and sees Cheryl drive away to the police department with the earrings. He pre-emptively phones the police, and Cheryl is accused of robbery. The two confront each other at the police station, but Albert opts not to press charges. However, the scene leaves Police Lt. Lawrence Mathews, who is also a law student at night school, suspicious.

Lawrence goes to Cheryl's apartment and tells her that Albert is an ex-Nazi who had been "denazified" and is now an unsuccessful author who is marrying a wealthy heiress. The two meet again when the body of an unidentified woman is found in Griffith Park. Cheryl comes off as conspiratorial and Lawrence believes she is pretending and obsessing about the case; he believes she is telling the truth that she saw something, but does not think what she saw was reality. She is forcibly admitted to an insane asylum after Albert surreptitiously types threatening letters from Cheryl to him to frame her as crazy and a threat to his safety.

After Cheryl is released she returns home where she mentally puts the pieces together. Intending to confront Albert she rushes to his apartment where he confesses that he killed the woman because she was insignificant to him and he did not want his future wealth to be threatened. His angry tirade includes words spoken in German, returning to English to tell Cheryl that because she is officially labeled insane by the police and has no credibility he does not fear admitting this all to her, including a suggestion that her death is imminent.

Cheryl rushes to the police station to relay those events to Lawrence, who tells her Albert just called to tell him she was at his apartment. This leads Cheryl to realize Albert's call was an attempt to further paint her as insane. Seeing Lawrence still isn't convinced and that Albert's plan has been effective, she knows she's helpless and races out of his office. Cheryl is confronted by Albert in front of the building where he tells her that he knew the police wouldn't believe her. She flees just as Lawrence appears from the elevator where he encounters Albert, who overemphatically offers to help pay to have Cheryl committed.

Suspicious of Albert's "generosity" Lawrence and Sgt. Eddie Vincent go to the apartment building of the deceased woman (who was revealed to be a Miss Joyce Stewart) to see if anyone there recognizes Albert's picture from his book cover, but no one does. As a last resort Lawrence and Eddie take a look at the dead woman's apartment where Lawrence finds Albert's book, and now believing that Cheryl has been telling the truth hurries out of the apartment.

After returning home Cheryl finds Albert already inside, presenting her with a purported suicide note that says she will kill herself, and he tries to push her out of her window. Before he can do that a policewoman--who Lawrence had previously asked Eddie to have look in on Cheryl--buzzes at the door providing an opportunity for Cheryl to escape. She is pursued by Albert, as well as by Lawrence who has just arrived and is accompanied by the police. Cheryl runs up a high-rise that is under construction and when she gets to the top is cornered by Albert, where standing on the ledge she loses her balance and falls off but a few construction planks below the precipice breaks her fall. Lawrence, who has been pursuing them to the top, arrives where Albert attempts to kill him, but after a brief struggle it is Albert who falls to his death. With Cheryl's weight causing the planks to collapse Lawrence grabs her hand just as the planks give way, pulling her up. Having rescued her Lawrence and Cheryl leave the scene with the police in tow.

== Cast ==
- Barbara Stanwyck as Cheryl Draper
- George Sanders as Albert Richter
- Gary Merrill as Police Lt. Lawrence "Larry" Mathews
- Jesse White as Police Sgt. Eddie Vincent
- Harry Shannon as Police Capt. Donnelly
- Claire Carleton as May, The Blonde and a mental patient
- Lewis Martin as Psychiatrist
- Dick Elliott as Apartment Manager
- Harry Tyler as Charlie
- Juanita Moore as Mental Patient (end credits list as "Negress")
- Joy Hallward as Fellow Worker
- Adeline De Walt Reynolds as The Old Lady
- Claude Akins as Police Officer on guard at the murder victim's apartment (uncredited)
- Sam Edwards as Tommy - Counterman

== Critical response ==
The New York Times found the film a "sensitively executed but hardly inspired exercise in premeditated murder....the tension inherent in the search for a murderer is largely lacking in this adventure, which exposes him at the outset to the witness of the title and the audience." The Brooklyn Eagle described the film as a "crime thriller [that] uses effectively the cat-and-mouse technique to tighten tension. As an excitement-creator, it's above average....There are holes in the story, but it's exciting enough to make anyone disregard them." Columnist Jimmie Fidler opined that "Director Roy Rowland has concentrated the story development on suspense, and every foot of the film yields something to that effort" and that all three principal actors "score with convincing performances." Film critic Dennis Schwartz, writing in 2000, appreciated the work of cinematographer John Alton but gave the film a mixed review, writing, "The camerawork of John Alton is the star of this vehicle. His camerawork sets a dark mood of the Los Angeles scenario, escalating the dramatics with shadowy building shots. The twist in the story is that as upstanding a citizen as Stanwyck is, the authorities still side with the Nazi Sanders because he has a higher status. The noir theme of alienation is richly furnished. But the rub is in the story's credibility— Stanwyck was just too strong a character to be so completely victimized."

== Adaptations ==
Witness to Murder was featured on Lux Video Theatre in January 1956, starring Audrey Totter, Onslow Stevens and Paul Langton in the leading roles.
