= The Human Factor (1963 The Outer Limits) =

- The Outer Limits episode
- Episode no.: Season 1 Episode 8
- Directed by: Abner Biberman
- Written by: David Duncan
- Cinematography by: Conrad Hall
- Production code: 3
- Original air date: November 11, 1963

Guest appearances
- Gary Merrill; Harry Guardino

Episode chronology
← Previous "O.B.I.T."	Next → "Corpus Earthling"

"The Human Factor" is an episode of the original The Outer Limits television show. It first aired on November 11, 1963, during the first season. The title was re-used in 2002 for an episode with an unrelated plot.

== Opening narration ==
In northern Greenland, the mountains stand like a wall along Victoria Channel, whose straight course marks the line of the great Baffin Fault. Until recently, not even the Eskimos ventured into this arctic waste; but, today, as in other lonely places of the world, the land is dominated by those instruments of detection which stand as a grim reminder of Man's fear of Man. This is Point TABU, a name given this predominantly underground base by a young officer who explained that the letters in TABU stood for 'Total Abandonment of Better Understanding'. Some two hundred men and a few women make this their permanent residence. Their task is to maintain a constant alert against enemy attack, and be prepared to respond to it, devastatingly.

== Plot ==
At a military outpost in Greenland, Project Engineer Maj. Brothers begins losing his grip on reality - while wrestling with guilt and remorse - after losing one of his soldiers in an icy crevasse. Mentally haunted by a spectre of the dead man, Brothers decides he must detonate an atomic device to obliterate the crevasse, along with any implicating evidence of self-imposed incompetence - and the outpost, as well - to purge himself of his emotional anguish. The outpost's psychiatrist, Dr. Hamilton, uses a revolutionary mind probe machine in an attempt to understand what is driving Brothers mad. During the experiment, Hamilton learns of the officer's plan to destroy the outpost as their minds join for a split second. When an unexpected earthquake causes the device to malfunction, the minds of Hamilton and Brothers are switched. This new identity enables the insane officer to set about his plan for destruction while in the guise of the doctor, with the real doctor confined to a padded cell, desperately trying to warn everyone of the impending doom. When Hamilton's administrative assistant, Ingrid, who had earlier expressed her love for the doctor, reads his notes that were taken prior to the experiment, she learns of the possible exchange of minds between the two men. When Ingrid goes to the cell to talk with Brothers, he convinces her that he is actually the man she loves by revealing an intimate detail regarding their relationship. She helps him to escape. Meanwhile, attempting to obtain information from another officer on how to detonate the bomb, Brothers is ordered to return to the doctor's office, where he encounters Hamilton and Ingrid. Brothers, intent on killing Hamilton before he can expose his true identity, is mortally wounded during Hamilton's attempt to attach the electrodes from the mind probe machine - with help from Ingrid - to himself and to Brothers. At the final moment of the process, just before Brothers dies, Hamilton's mind is successfully returned to his body. Afterwards, both Hamilton and Ingrid try to make sense of the ordeal, while wondering how to explain the unbelievable circumstances surrounding Brothers' death, with Hamilton suggesting that they simply tell the truth - Maj. Brothers shot himself.

== Closing narration ==
A weapon? No, only an instrument: neither good nor evil, until men put it to use. And then, like so many of Man's inventions, it can be used either to save lives or destroy them, to make men sane or to drive them mad, to increase human understanding or to betray it. But, it will be men who make the choice. By itself, the instrument is nothing, until you add the human factor.

== Cast ==
- Gary Merrill – as Dr. James Hamilton
- Harry Guardino – as Maj. Roger Brothers
- Sally Kellerman – as Ingrid Larkin
- Ivan Dixon – as Harold Giles
- Joe De Santis – as Bill Campbell
- John Newton – as Peterson
- Shirley O'Hara – as Dr. Soldini
- James Sikking – as Orderly
- Jane Langley – as Nurse

== Sequel ==
Author Kevin J. Anderson later wrote a prose sequel to the episode entitled "Memories on Ice". It was published in 2000 as part of the anthology The Outer Limits: Armageddon Dreams.
