= Gary Merrill =

American actor (1915–1990)

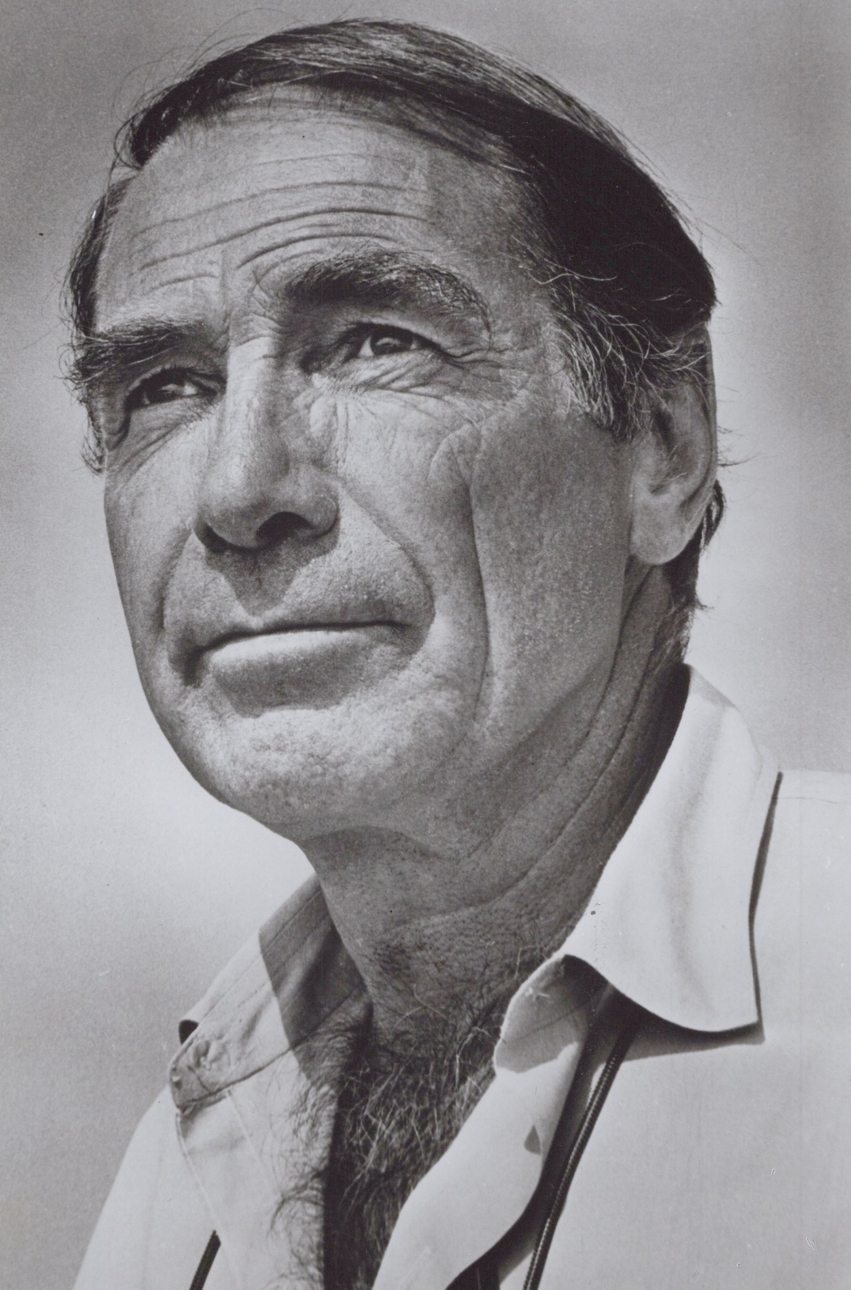
- Merrill in 1970
- Born: Gary Fred Merrill; August 2, 1915; Hartford, Connecticut, U.S.
- Died: March 5, 1990 (aged 74); Falmouth, Maine, U.S.
- Occupation: Actor
- Years active: 1943–1980
- Spouses: Barbara Leeds (m. 1941; div. 1950) Bette Davis (m. 1950; div. 1960)
- Children: 2

Gary Fred Merrill (August 2, 1915 – March 5, 1990) was an American film and television actor whose credits included more than 50 feature films, a half-dozen mostly short-lived TV series, and dozens of television guest appearances. He starred in All About Eve and married his costar Bette Davis.

== Early life ==
Merrill was born in Hartford, Connecticut, and attended Bowdoin College in Brunswick, Maine, and Trinity College in Hartford. He began acting in 1944, while still in the United States Army Air Forces, in the play Winged Victory.

== Career ==
Before entering films, Merrill's deep cultured voice won him a recurring role as Bruce Wayne / Batman in the Superman radio series. His film career began promisingly, with roles in films such as Twelve O'Clock High (1949) and All About Eve (1950), but he rarely moved beyond supporting roles in his many Westerns, war movies, and medical dramas. He played a detective and love interest of Barbara Stanwyck's character in Witness to Murder (1954). His television career was extensive. He appeared from 1954 to 1956 as Jason Tyler on the crime drama Justice.

In 1958, Merrill guest starred with June Lockhart in the roles of Joshua and Emily Newton in the episode "Medicine Man" of the series Cimarron City.

Merrill had recurring roles in Then Came Bronson with Michael Parks and Young Doctor Kildare, both of which lasted less than a season.

In addition to Merrill's starring roles in several episodes of Alfred Hitchcock Presents, in November 1963 he starred with Phyllis Thaxter and Fess Parker (Daniel Boone) in an episode of The Alfred Hitchcock Hour ("Nothing Ever Happens in Linvale").

In 1964, he starred as city editor Lou Sheldon in the short-lived drama The Reporter.

In 1967, he starred in the Elvis Presley film Clambake, with costar James Gregory.

Aside from an occasional role as narrator, Merrill essentially retired from the entertainment business after 1980. Shortly before his death, he authored the autobiography Bette, Rita and the Rest of My Life (1989).

== Personal life and death ==
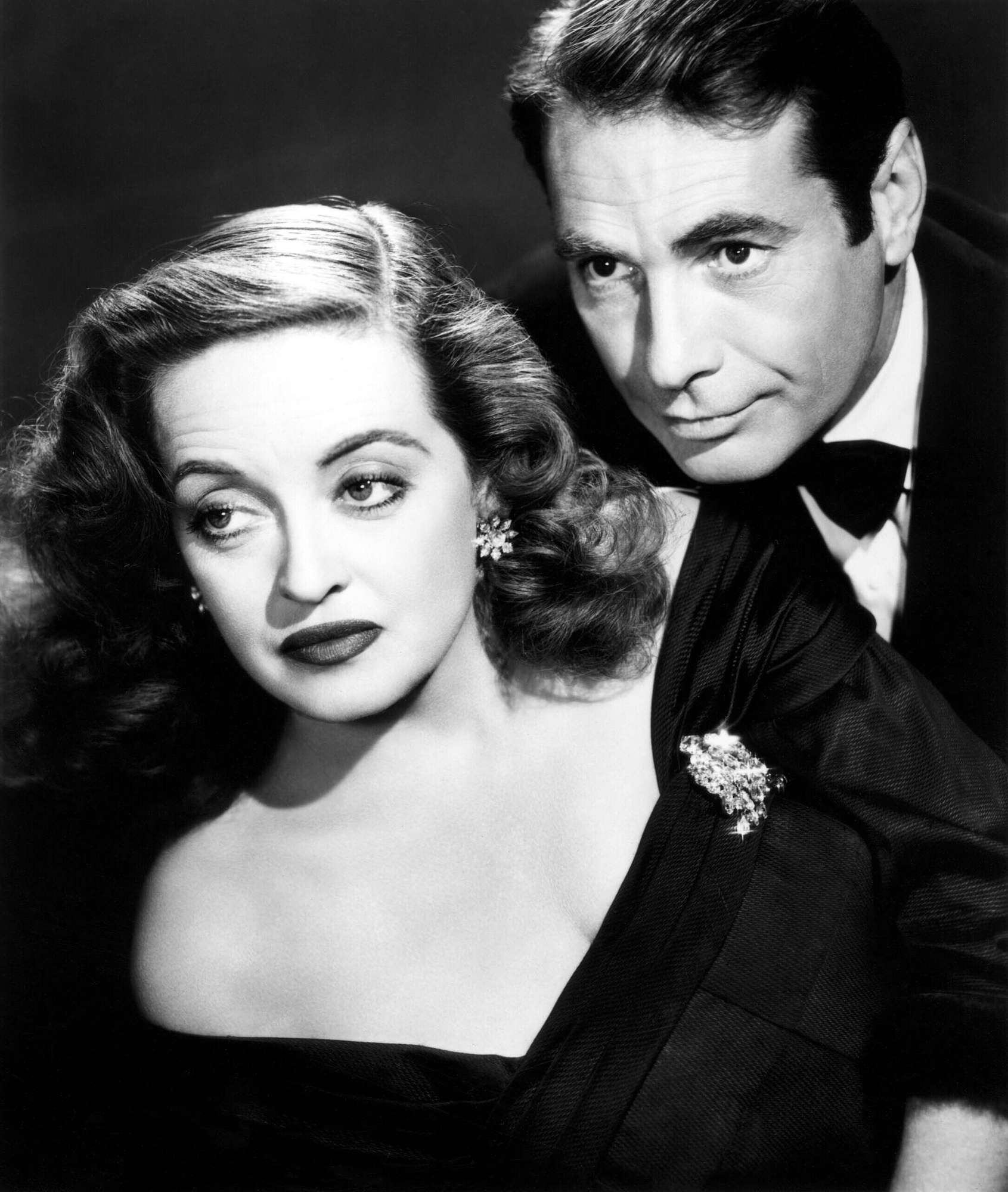
Merrill posing in a promotional image for All About Eve (1950): He is pictured with Bette Davis, to whom he was married from 1950 to 1960.

Merrill's first marriage, to Barbara Leeds in 1941, ended in divorce in Mexico on July 28, 1950. That same day, he married Bette Davis, his costar from All About Eve, and adopted her daughter, Barbara, from a previous marriage. They adopted two more children, Margot and Michael, but they had a bitter divorce in 1960.

Often politically active, he campaigned in 1958 to elect the Democrat Edmund Muskie as governor of Maine. He also took part in the Selma to Montgomery marches in 1965 to promote Black voter registration. In response to U.S. President Lyndon B. Johnson's Vietnam War policy, he unsuccessfully sought nomination to the Maine legislature as an anti-war, pro-environmentalist primary candidate.

Merrill survived his second ex-wife, Bette Davis, by only five months, dying of lung cancer in Falmouth, Maine, on March 5, 1990. He is buried in the Pine Grove Cemetery. He was survived by a son, Michael; a daughter, Margot; a brother, Jerry; and two grandchildren.

== Filmography ==
- This Is the Army (1943) - Backstage Military Policeman on Right (uncredited)
- Winged Victory (1944) - Captain McIntyre
- Slattery's Hurricane (1949) - Commander E.T. Kramer
- Twelve O'Clock High (1949) - Colonel Keith Davenport
- Mother Didn't Tell Me (1950) - Doctor Peter Roberts
- Where the Sidewalk Ends (1950) - Tommy Scalise
- All About Eve (1950) - Bill Sampson (A typographical error in the film's credits lists the character's name as "Simpson").
- Rawhide (1951) - Narrator (voice, uncredited)
- The Frogmen (1951) - Lieutenant Commander Pete Vincent
- Another Man's Poison (1951) - George Bates
- Decision Before Dawn (1951) - Colonel Devlin
- Phone Call from a Stranger (1952) - David Trask
- The Girl in White (1952) - Dr. Seth Pawling
- Night Without Sleep (1952) - Richard Morton
- A Blueprint for Murder (1953) - Fred Sargent
- Witness to Murder (1954) - Lawrence Mathews
- The Black Dakotas (1954) - Brock Marsh, posing as Zachary Paige
- The Human Jungle (1954) - Police Captain John Danforth
- Navy Wife (1956) - Jack Blain
- Bermuda Affair (1956) - Bob Scoffield
- The Missouri Traveler (1958) - Doyle Magee
- Crash Landing (1958) - Captain Steve Williams
- The Wonderful Country (1959) - Major Stark Colton
- The Savage Eye (1960) - The Poet
- The Great Impostor (1961) - Pa Demara
- The Pleasure of His Company (1961) - James Dougherty
- Mysterious Island (1961) - Gideon Spilitt
- A Girl Named Tamiko (1962) - Max Wilson
- Hong Kong un Addio (1963) (Farewell to Hong Kong)
- The Searching Eye (Short) (1964) - Narrator
- Catacombs (1965) - Raymond Garth
- Ride Beyond Vengeance (1966) - Dub Stokes
- Cast a Giant Shadow (1966) - Pentagon Chief of Staff (scenes deleted)
- Destination Inner Space (1966) - Dr. LaSatier
- Around the World Under the Sea (1966) - Dr. August 'Gus' Boren
- The Last Challenge (1967) - Squint Calloway
- Clambake (1967) - Sam
- The Incident (1967) - Douglas McCann
- The Power (1968) - Mark Corlane
- Più tardi, Claire, più tardi (1968) - George Dennison
- Amarsi male (1969) as Ingegner Andrea Soriani
- The Secret of the Sacred Forest (1970) - Mike Parks
- Earth II (1971) - Walter Dietrich
- Huckleberry Finn (1974) - Pap
- Thieves (1977) - Street Man
- For Liberty and Union (Short) (1977) - Narrator
- The Seekers (1979) - Captain Hull

== Television, partial ==
Merrill's television work spanned from 1953 to 1980. Most of his appearances were in guest-star roles in episodic and anthology series. Among the programs he appeared in were:

- The 20th Century-Fox Hour (1956)
  - (Season 1 Episode 8: "Yacht on the High Sea") as Alan Byrnes
  - (Season 1 Episode 10: "Crack-Up") as David Trask
- Wagon Train (1957) (Season 1 Episode 11: "The Zeke Thomas Story") as Zeke Thomas
- The Jane Wyman Show (1958) (Season 3 Episode 23: "The Last Test") as Dicksen
- Studio 57 (1958) (Season 4 Episode 17: "The Starmaker")
- Studio One (1958) (Season 10 Episode 45: "The Lady Died at Midnight") as Paul Gormay
- Cimarron City (1958) (Season 1 Episode 5: "Medicine Man") as Joshua Newton
- Playhouse 90
  - (Season 1 Episode 28: "If You Knew Elizabeth") (1957) as Walter Hubbard
  - (Season 3 Episode 17: "A Quiet Game of Cards") (1959) as McBurnie
  - (Season 3 Episode 29: "A Corner of the Garden") (1959) as Louis
- Alcoa Theatre (1959) (Season 2 Episode 17: "The Best Way to Go") as Dick Bowen
- Rawhide (1959) (Season 1 Episode 17: "Incident of Fear in the Streets") as Jed Mason
- Laramie (1959) (Season 1 Episode 14: "The Lonesome Gun") as Ed Farrell
- The Twilight Zone (Episode "Still Valley" as Confederate soldier Joseph Paradine)
- Alfred Hitchcock Presents
  - (Season 2 Episode 18: "The Manacled") (1955) as Sergeant Rockwell
  - (Season 3 Episode 25: "Flight to the East") (1958) as Ted Franklin
  - (Season 4 Episode 7: "Man with a Problem") (1958) as Carl Adams
  - (Season 4 Episode 36: "Invitation to an Accident") (1959) as Joseph Pond
  - (Season 6 Episode 8: "Youth and Beauty") (1960) as Cash Bentley
- Zane Grey Theatre
  - (Season 1 Episode 27: "Badge of Honor") (1957) as Colonel Boyd Nelson
  - (Season 2 Episode 6: "The Promise") (1957) as Noah Rawlins
  - (Season 2 Episode 29: "Utopia, Wyoming") (1958) as Luke Cannon
  - (Season 5 Episode 27: "The Release") (1961) as Ken Kenyon
- General Electric Theater
  - (Season 6 Episode 28: "God Is My Judge") (1958) as McMasters
  - (Season 10 Episode 11: "Money and the Minister") (1961) as John Dwight
- Checkmate (1961) (Season 1 Episode 20: "A Matter of Conscience") as Ernie Stone
- Winston Churchill: The Valiant Years (1960-1963) as Narrator
- Ben Casey (1963) (Season 2 Episode 17: "Use Neon for My Epitaph") as Miles Houghton
- Combat! (1963) (Season 1 Episode 30: "The Walking Wounded") as Captain August
- Sam Benedict (1963) (Season 1 Episode 18: "Boiling Point") as Sergeant Bill Merriman
- The Alfred Hitchcock Hour (1963)
  - (Season 1 Episode 20: "The Paragon") as John Pemberton
  - (Season 2 Episode 6: "Nothing Ever Happens in Linvale") as Harry Jarvis
- The Outer Limits (1963) (Season 1 Episode 8 "The Human Factor") as Dr. James Hamilton / Major Roger Brothers
- Branded (1965)
  - (Season 2 Episode 13: "Romany Roundup: Part 1") as Aaron Shields
  - (Season 2 Episode 14: "Romany Roundup: Part 2") as Aaron Shields
- Bob Hope Presents the Chrysler Theatre (1965) (Season 3 Episode 8: "The Highest Fall of All") as John Perry
- Voyage to the Bottom of the Sea (1966) (Season 2 Episode 24: "The Menfish") as Park
- The Time Tunnel (1966) (Season 1 Episode 1: "Rendezvous with Yesterday") as Senator Leroy Clark
- Marcus Welby, M.D. (1970) (Season 2 Episode 2: "The Worth of a Man") as Orlando 'Cord' Corday
- Medical Center (1973) (Season 4 Episode 23: "Fatal Memory") as Jason Norman
- Kung Fu (1974) (Season 2 Episode 15: "The Way of Violence Has No Mind") as Dan Hoyle
- Cannon (1976) (Season 5 Episode 18: "Revenge") as Andrew McGill
- Movin' On
  - (Season 1 Episode 7: "The Good Life") (1974) as Paul Lorimer
  - (Season 2 Episode 8: "Prosperity #1") (1975) as Samson
- The American Adventure (narrator, 1971–1972)

== Radio appearances ==
Year	Program	Episode/source
1952	Lux Radio Theatre	Follow the Sun
1952	Hollywood Star Playhouse	"The Patient Stranger"
1953	Lux Radio Theatre	Phone Call from a Stranger
