= David Duncan (writer) =

American novelist (1913–1999)

- Born: February 17, 1913
- Died: December 26, 1999 (aged 86); Everett, Washington, USA
- Occupations: Screenwriter; novelist

David Duncan (February 17, 1913 – December 26, 1999) was an American screenwriter and novelist.

== Biography ==
He began writing professionally at the age of 33 after about ten years in government. His screenwriting career began in 1953 with the release of his first film and Paramount's first 3-D film, Sangaree. Duncan is remembered for his work in science fiction such as the films Monster on the Campus (1958), The Time Machine (1960) and Fantastic Voyage (1966). He was credited with writing the English narrative for Rodan (1956). He also wrote for many television series such as National Velvet (1960), The Outer Limits ("The Human Factor", 1963), and Daniel Boone (1964–70). His science fiction novels include Dark Dominion (1954), Beyond Eden (1955), and Occam's Razor (1957). He also wrote six novels outside the genre. Duncan wrote Time Machine: The Journey Back a 48-minute PBS documentary and mini-sequel to George Pal's 1960 movie The Time Machine.

== Filmography ==
=== Film ===
Year	Title	Notes
1953	Sangaree	Co-written with Frank L. Moss; adaptation of the 1948 novel of the same name by Frank G. Slaughter
1954	Jivaro	Wrote story; screenplay written by Winston Miller
1954	The White Orchid	Co-written with Reginald LeBorg
1956	Rodan	Wrote English-language version
1957	The Monster That Challenged the World	Wrote story; screenplay written by Pat Fielder
1957	The Black Scorpion	Co-written with Robert Blees
1958	Monster on the Campus	
1958	The Thing That Couldn't Die	
1960	The Leech Woman	Adaptation of the 1959 story by Ben Pivar and Francis Rosenwald
1960	The Time Machine	Adaptation of the 1895 novel by H. G. Wells.
1966	Fantastic Voyage	Adaptation of the 1965 story by Otto Klement and Jerome Bixby; screenplay written by Harry Kleiner
1993	Time Machine: The Journey Back	

=== Television ===
Year	Title	Notes
1958	Telephone Time	Wrote episode "Man of Principle"
1959–1960	Men into Space	7 episodes
1960	National Velvet	Wrote episode "Barbecue"
1960–1961	My Three Sons	5 episodes
1962	It's a Man's World	Wrote episodes "Molly Pitcher and the Green Eyed Monster" and "Night Beat of the Tom-Tom"
1963	Our Man Higgins	Wrote episode "Love Is Dandy"
1963	The Outer Limits	Wrote episode "The Human Factor"
1964–1970	Daniel Boone	21 episodes
1966	The F.B.I.	Wrote episode "The Divided Man" (story by)
1968–1969	The New Adventures of Huckleberry Finn	4 episodes
1969	The High Chaparral	Wrote episode "The Lost Ones"

== Works ==
=== Novels ===
- Remember the Shadows (1944)
- The Shade of Time (1946)
- The Bramble Bush (1948)
- The Madrone Tree (1950)
- None But My Foe (1950)
- The Serpent's Egg (1950)
- Wives and Husbands (1952)
- Dark Dominion (1954)
- Beyond Eden (aka Another Tree in Eden) (1955)
- The Trumpet of God (1956)
- Occam's Razor (1957)
- Yes, My Darling Daughters (1959)
- The Long Walk Home from Town (1964)

=== Short stories ===
- "The Immortals" Galaxy, October 1960
