= Alan Young =

British actor (1919–2016)

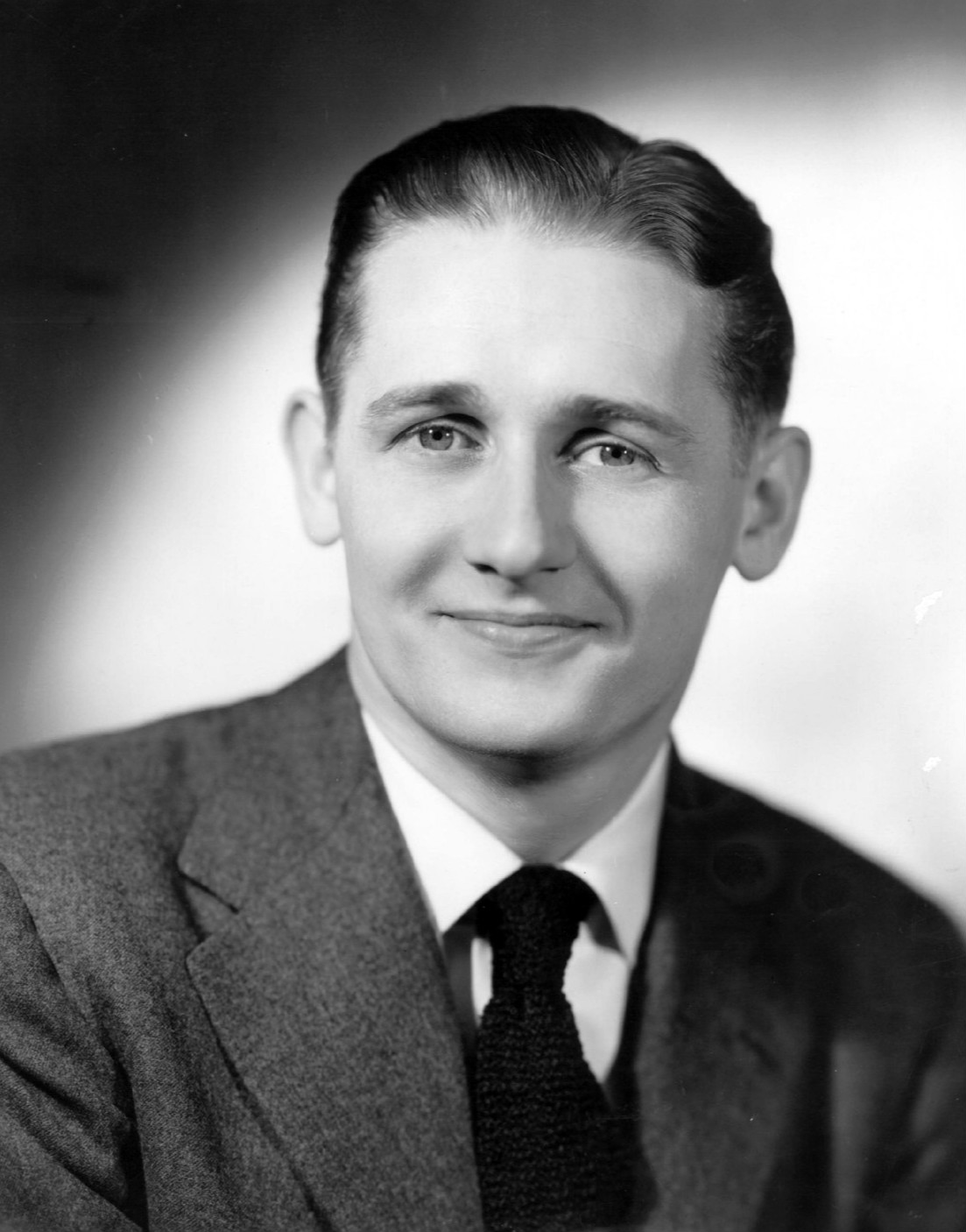
- Young in 1944
- Born: Alan Angus Young; 19 November 1919; North Shields, Northumberland, England
- Died: 19 May 2016 (aged 96); Los Angeles, California, U.S.
- Citizenship: United Kingdom; Canada (from 1925); United States (from 1944)
- Occupations: Actor; comedian; radio presenter
- Years active: 1933–2016
- Spouses: Mary Anne Grimes (m. 1941; div. 1947); Virginia McCurdy (m. 1948; div. 1995); Mary Chipman (m. 1996; div. 1997)
- Children: 4
- Relatives: Laura Mennell (cousin)
- Awards: Primetime Emmy Award for Best Actor

Alan Angus Young (19 November 1919 – 19 May 2016) was a British actor. He is best known for portraying Wilbur Post in the television comedy Mister Ed (1961–1966) and voicing Disney's Scrooge McDuck for over 40 years, beginning in the 1974 Disneyland Records album An Adaptation of Dickens' Christmas Carol, Performed by The Walt Disney Players. He again voiced Scrooge in the Academy Award-nominated short film Mickey's Christmas Carol (1983) and continued in the role in various other films, television series and video games up until his death. He was considered by TV Guide to be "the Charlie Chaplin of television".

During the 1940s and 1950s, Young starred in his own variety-comedy sketch shows The Alan Young Show on radio and television, the latter gaining him two Emmy Awards in 1951. He also appeared in a number of feature films, starting from 1946, including the 1960 film The Time Machine and from the 1980s gaining a new generation of viewers appearing in numerous Walt Disney Productions films as an actor.

== Early life and education ==
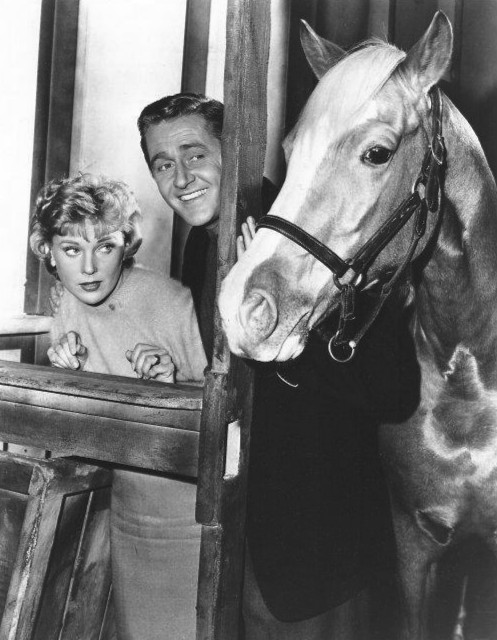
Connie Hines and Young in Mister Ed

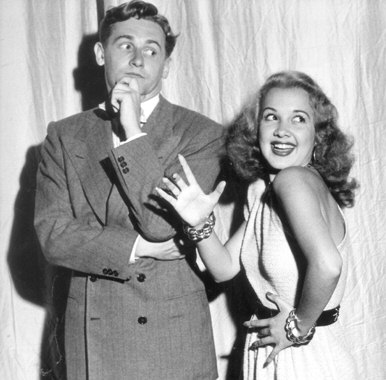
Young with Olga San Juan c. 1950s

Young was born on 19 November 1919, in North Shields, Northumberland, England, to Scottish parents. His father was a mine worker and a tap dancer, and his mother was a singer. The family moved to Edinburgh, Scotland, when Young was a toddler and to West Vancouver, British Columbia, Canada, when he was six years old. Young came to love radio when bedridden as a child because of severe asthma. In a 1967 interview he credited Christian Science for his healing of asthma.

By the time he entered high school, Young had his own comedy radio series on the CBC network, but he left it during the Second World War to serve in the Royal Canadian Navy.

Young later resigned his Navy commission after learning he would be spending his time writing for a Navy show, and he attempted to join the Canadian Army. According to some sources, the Army rejected him owing to his childhood asthma.

== Career ==
After leaving the service, Young moved to Toronto and resumed his Canadian radio career, where he was discovered by an American agent who brought him to New York City in 1944 to appear on American radio. Young's first American radio appearances were on the Philco Radio Hall of Fame. This led to his own show, The Alan Young Show, NBC's summer replacement for the series The Eddie Cantor Show. He switched to ABC two years later, then returned to NBC.

Young's film debut was in Margie (1946), and he was featured in Chicken Every Sunday (1949). In 1950, the television version of The Alan Young Show began. By 1951, the series received not only praise, but also several Primetime Emmy Awards, including Best Actor and Most Outstanding Personality for Young.

After its cancellation, Young continued to act in films, among which Androcles and the Lion (1952) and Gentlemen Marry Brunettes (1955), and two George Pal films, Tom Thumb (1958) and The Time Machine (1960). He appeared in the NBC espionage drama Five Fingers ("Thin Ice", 1959), starring David Hedison.

Young was best known for Mister Ed (1961–66), a CBS television show, in which he starred as Wilbur Post, the owner of Mr. Ed, a talking horse who would not talk to anyone but him, thus causing comic situations for Wilbur Post, with his wife, neighbors, and acquaintances. In 1962 while not filming Mister Ed Young appeared as John Stetson (inventor of the famous western Stetson hat) on Death Valley Days in the episode "The Hat that Won the West." He also starred as Stanley Beamish in the unaired 1966 pilot episode of Mr. Terrific, but apparently declined to appear in the broadcast series in 1967 that followed. In the late 1960s, he retired from acting for several years. During that time, he gave lectures on Christian Science and help to start the broadcast division for the Christian Science Church.

During the 1970s, Young became active in voice acting. After 1974, he voiced Scrooge McDuck in numerous Disney films and in the popular series DuckTales (1987–1990). In Mickey's Christmas Carol, he portrayed the character's miserly namesake. He also played Scrooge in video games such as the Kingdom Hearts series, DuckTales: Remastered in 2013, and the Mickey Mouse cartoon "Goofy's First Love" released in 2015. Apart from Scrooge McDuck, his other prominent roles were Farmer Smurf on The Smurfs, Haggis McHaggis on The Ren & Stimpy Show, 7-Zark-7 & Keyop in Battle of the Planets, and Hiram Flaversham in The Great Mouse Detective. He also guest starred on The Love Boat, The Incredible Hulk, The New Scooby and Scrappy-Doo Show, and Spider-Man and His Amazing Friends.

Young later starred in the sitcom Coming of Age for two seasons from 1988 to 1989. In 1991, Alan Young returned to the stage, starring as Cap'n Andy Hawkes in the California Musical Theatre's adaptation of Show Boat. He had been called for the role after Van Johnson, who was initially cast in the part, was hospitalised. He had also appeared in the plays A Funny Thing Happened on the Way to the Forum and The Girl with the Freudian Slip. In 1993, he recreated his role as Filby for the mini-sequel to George Pal's The Time Machine, reuniting him with Rod Taylor, who had played George, the Time Traveller. It was called Time Machine: The Journey Back, directed by Clyde Lucas.

In 1994, Young co-starred in the Eddie Murphy film Beverly Hills Cop III. He played the role of Uncle Dave Thornton, the Walt Disney-esque founder of the fictional California theme park Wonderworld, and in that same year, Young played the role of Charley in the television film, Hart to Hart: Home Is Where the Hart Is.

After 1994, he played at least eight characters, including antique dealer Jack Allen on the radio drama Adventures in Odyssey. In 1997, he did the voice of Haggis McMutton in the PC game The Curse of Monkey Island. His later guest roles in animated series included Megas XLR, Static Shock, House of Mouse, The Ren & Stimpy Show, Duckman, Batman: The Animated Series and TaleSpin. In 2002, he had a cameo as the flower store worker in Simon Wells's remake of The Time Machine, and in 2010, he read H. G. Wells's original novel for 7th Voyage Productions, Inc. Young's television guest roles include Gibbsville, The Love Boat, Murder, She Wrote, St. Elsewhere, Coach, Party of Five, The Wayans Bros., USA High, Hang Time, ER, Maybe It's Me, and Sabrina, the Teenage Witch ("Sweet Charity", 1997) in which he played Zelda's love interest.

== Personal life ==
Young was married three times. He and Mary Anne Grimes were married from 1941 to 1947 and had two children.

In interviews with Greg Bell, host of SiriusXM's satellite radio "Old Time Radio" program, Young described having dated Marilyn Monroe several times.

Young married his second wife Virginia McCurdy in 1948 and they had two children. They divorced in 1995.

Young married his third wife Mary Chipman the following year, in 1996, and they divorced the following year, in 1997. He dedicated his book Mr. Ed and Me to Chipman.

Young supported Ronald Reagan, although he stated in a later interview that he was apolitical.

In his later years, Young suffered financial difficulties and declining health while enduring dissension among his four children over who should have control of his person and estate.

== Death ==
Young spent his final years at Motion Picture & Television Country House and Hospital, a retirement community in Woodland Hills, California. He died there of organ failure on 19 May 2016, at the age of 96 and was buried at sea.

== Filmography ==
=== Film ===
Year	Title	Role	Notes
1946	Margie	Roy Hornsdale	
1949	Chicken Every Sunday	Geoffrey Lawson	
1949	Mr. Belvedere Goes to College	Avery Brubaker	
1952	Aaron Slick from Punkin Crick	Aaron Slick	
1952	Androcles and the Lion	Androcles	
1955	Gentlemen Marry Brunettes	Charlie Biddle / Mrs. Biddle / Mr. Henry Biddle	
1958	Tom Thumb	Woody	
1960	The Time Machine	David Filby / James Filby	
1976	Baker's Hawk	Paul Carson	
1978	The Cat from Outer Space	Doctor Winger	
1983	Mickey's Christmas Carol	Scrooge McDuck (voice)	Also writer
1985	The Fantasy Film Worlds of George Pal	Himself	Documentary
1986	The Great Mouse Detective	Hiram Flaversham (voice)	
1987	Alice Through the Looking Glass	White Knight (voice)	
1990	DuckTales the Movie: Treasure of the Lost Lamp	Scrooge McDuck (voice)	
1993	Time Machine: The Journey Back	Filby	
1993	Disney Sing-Along Songs	Scrooge McDuck (voice)	Segment: "The Twelve Days of Christmas"
1994	Beverly Hills Cop III	Dave Thornton	
1996	The Flintstones Christmas in Bedrock	Additional voices	
1997	The Curse of Monkey Island	Haggis McMutton	
1999	Mickey's Once Upon a Christmas	Scrooge McDuck (voice)	Direct-to-video
2002	The Time Machine	Flower Store Worker	
2004	Em & Me	Grandfather	San Diego Film Festival Award for Best Actor; Monaco International Festival Best Actor Award
2004	Mickey's Twice Upon a Christmas	Scrooge McDuck (voice)	Direct-to-video
2023	Once Upon a Studio	Scrooge McDuck (voice)	Archival recordings

=== Television ===
Year	Title	Role	Notes
1950–1953	The Alan Young Show	Alan	Television version Lead Role; Primetime Emmy Award for Outstanding Lead Actor in a Comedy Series (1951); Nominated – Primetime Emmy for Most Outstanding Personality (1951)
1954	General Electric Theater	Alan Parker	Episode: "Wild Luke's Boy"
1955	Screen Director's Playhouse	Ernest Stockhoeffer/Vernon Hathaway	Episode: "The Life of Vernon Hathaway"
1955–1956	Studio One	George Abernathy, Timothy	2 episodes
1956	Chevron Hall of Stars	Robinson	Episode: "I Killed John Harrington"
1956	Matinee Theatre		Episode: "Ask Me No Questions"
1956	Studio 57	Hector Tutwilder	Episode: "Swing Your Partner, Hector"
1956–1958	The Steve Allen Show	Himself	5 episodes
1958	Alan Young (TV series)	Alan	3 episodes
1959	Five Fingers	Carl	Episode: "Thin Ice"
1959	Encounter	Wilbur Bowser	Episode: "The Last of the Hot Pilots"
1960	Startime	Clarence	Episode: "Tennessee Ernie Ford Meets King Arthur"
1961–1966	Mister Ed	Wilbur Post	Lead role (143 episodes)
1962	Death Valley Days	John B. Stetson	Episode: "The Hat That Won the West"
1966	Mr. Terrific	Stanley Beamish	TV pilot
1976	Gibbsville	Kanzler	Episode: "Saturday Night"
1978–1980	Battle of the Planets	7-Zark-7, Keyop (voice)	English version
1978, 1983	The Love Boat	Phil Sharpe, Ross	2 episodes
1980	Humpty	Humpty Dumpty (voice)	
1981	Spider-Man and His Amazing Friends	Mr. Frump (voice)	Episode: "The Fantastic Mr. Frump"
1982	The Incredible Hulk	Cyclops (voice)	Episode: "The Cyclops Project"
1982	Madame's Place	Ridgley, the Butler	Unaired pilot
1982–1989	The Smurfs	Farmer Smurf, Miner Smurf, Scaredy Smurf (voice)	49 episodes
1983	Alvin and the Chipmunks	Grandpa Seville (voice)	Episode: "Grandpa and Grandma Seville"
1983	The Dukes	Additional voices	7 episodes
1983	The New Scooby and Scrappy-Doo Show	Gaggy Rogers (voice)	Episode: "Wedding Bell Boos!"
1983	Saturday Supercade	Additional voices	13 episodes
1983	Mister T	Doctor Kirby (voice)	Episode: "Mystery on the Rocky Mountain Express"
1984	Robo Force	S.O.T.A.	TV film
1984	Down to Earth	Alistar Coogan	Episode: "Everything Old Is New Again"
1984–1985	General Hospital	Sam Morgan	
1986	Murder, She Wrote	Floyd Nelson	Episode: "Keep the Home Fries Burning"
1987	St. Elsewhere	Knox	Episode: "A Coupla White Dummies Sitting Around Talking"
1987–1990	DuckTales	Scrooge McDuck/Narrator (voice)	Lead role (97 episodes)
1988–1989	Coming of Age	Ed Pepper	15 episodes
1990	Walt Disney's Wonderful World of Color	Scrooge McDuck (voice)	Episode: "A DuckTales Valentine"
1990	TaleSpin	Doctor Cooper (voice)	Episode: "The Old Man and the Sea Duck"
1990	City	Donald	Episode: "Just a Passing Dad"
1991	Earth Angel	Norman	TV film
1992	Raw Toonage	Scrooge McDuck (voice)	Episode: "The Treasure of the Sierra Marsdre"
1993	Doogie Howser, M.D.	Doctor Emmitt Randall	Episode: "Eleven Angry People...and Vinnie"
1993	Coach	Ranger Farley	Episode: "One for the Road"
1993	A Flintstone Family Christmas	Mr. Gravelberry (voice)	TV film
1994	Batman: The Animated Series	Tod Baker (voice)	Episode: "Baby-Doll"
1994	Party of Five	Jack Gordon	Episode: "Homework"
1994	Hart to Hart	Charley Loomis	Episode: "Home Is Where the Hart Is"
1994–1995	The Ren & Stimpy Show	Haggis McHaggis (voice)	4 episodes
1995	Duckman	Wilbur Nelson (voice)	Episode: "America the Beautiful"
1995	Maybe This Time	Arthur	Episode: "Gracie Under Fire"
1995	The Wayans Bros.	Reverend Benton	Episode: "Loot"
1997	Sabrina the Teenage Witch	Mr. Berry	Episode: "Sweet Charity"
1997	USA High	Mr. Phipps	Episode: "Goodbye, Mr. Phipps"
1997	Beyond Belief: Fact or Fiction	Jake Gillespie	Episode: "The Diner"
1998	Kelly Kelly	Great Uncle Billy	Episode: "The Kilt Show"
1998	The Tony Danza Show	Doctor Harris	Episode: "Mini-pause"
1999	Mickey Mouse Works	Scrooge McDuck (voice)	2 episodes
2000	Rude Awakening	Priest	Episode: "Truth Don't Fail Me Now"
2000	Hang Time	Mr. McHenry	Episode: "That '60s Show"
2000	ER	Archie Mellonston	Episode: "Benton Backwards"
2001	God, the Devil and Bob	Wilbur Post (voice)	Episode: "God's Girlfriend"
2001	FreakyLinks	Henry	Episode: "Subject: Sunrise at Sunset Streams"
2001	Maybe It's Me	Abe Lasky	Episode: "The Hair Episode"
2002	House of Mouse	Scrooge McDuck (voice)	3 episodes
2004	Static Shock	Dr. McDonald (voice)	Episode: "Now You See Him..."
2004	Megas XLR	Jax (voice)	2 episodes
2015–2016	Mickey Mouse	Scrooge McDuck (voice)	2 episodes

=== Video games ===
Year	Title	Role
1997	The Curse of Monkey Island	Haggis McMutton
2008	Disney Think Fast	Scrooge McDuck
2010	Kingdom Hearts Birth by Sleep	Scrooge McDuck
2013	DuckTales: Scrooge's Loot	Scrooge McDuck
2013	DuckTales: Remastered	Scrooge McDuck

=== Radio ===
Year	Title	Role	Notes
1939	Stag Party	Himself	
1940–1944	The Alan Young Show	Alan	Canadian version
1944–1949	The Alan Young Show	Alan	U.S. version
1945	The Old Gold Comedy Theater; Known also as The Harold Lloyd Theatre	Bob Bennett	"Nothing but the Truth"
1947	Hedda Hopper's This Is Hollywood	Roy Hornsdale	"Margie"
1947–1948	Texaco Star Theatre	Himself	
1948–1949	The Jimmy Durante Show	Co-host	
1949–1950	Family Theater	Johnny the Leprechaun, Donald	"The Leprechaun Who Didn't Listen" "The Lion Tamer" "My Terminal Moraine"
1950	The Jack Benny Program	Himself	
1952	Hollywood Star Playhouse	Ernie	"Nor Gloom of Night"
1979	Sears Radio Theater	Harry Silverman, Otto Glitch, Steve	"The Care and Feeding of a Sex Symbol" "The Terrible Dream of Mr. Glitch" "A Very Nice Couple"
1994–2009, 2012	Adventures in Odyssey	Jack Allen	91 episodes
