= Gene Warren =

Special effects artist

Gene Warren Sr. (August 12, 1916 – July 17, 1997) was born in Denver, Colorado, and won an Academy Award for the special effects on George Pal's The Time Machine in 1960. He also contributed to such projects as The Way of Peace (1947), Land of the Lost (1974), Man from Atlantis, and The Crow: City of Angels.

He operated several visual effects companies in Hollywood over the years, including Excelsior Productions and Centaur Productions; the latter teamed with fellow effects artist Wah Ming Chang. Gene died of cancer on July 17, 1997, in Los Angeles.

His son, Gene Warren Jr., owned Fantasy II Film Effects and won an Academy Award for visual effects on Terminator 2: Judgment Day. Gene Warren Jr. died on November 28, 2019.

== Professional memberships ==
- Academy of Motion Picture Arts & Sciences
- Academy of Television Arts & Sciences
- American Youth Symphony Society
- Producers Guild of America

He was also an honorary member of Science Fiction Fantasy International and Fantasy Film Fans International.

== Awards ==
Academy of Motion Picture Arts & Sciences
Special Effects Award
The Time Machine
George Pal/MGM

Parents Magazine
Best Children's Show
The Tool Box
Excelsior!Amp/ABC-TV

Georges Melies Hall of Fame
The Seven Faces of Doctor Lao
George Pal/MGM

Georges Melies Hall of Fame
The Time Machine
George Pal/MGM

Art Directors & Artists Club of San Francisco
Billfold
Excelsior!Amp/Daniel Lewis Adv

Western Advertisers Association
Chuck Wagon-Farm
Excelsior!Amp/Gardner Adv

== Writer/Producer/Associate Producer/Director ==
Theatrical film
Starflight One - Writer

Television series
Land of the Lost (Pilot + 45 episodes) - Writer/Producer

Shorts
The Tool Box
Susy Snowflake
Santa and the Three Dwarfs
Land of the Midnight Sun

Documentary & training films
Mariner I
Mariner III
Apollo

Television commercials
Over 1200 commercials primarily for national prestige accounts and featuring such specialized concepts as The Pillsbury Dough Boy and Ralston-Purina's Chuck Wagon.

== Production Designer/Special Effects Director/2nd Unit Director ==
Theatrical film
The French Atlantic Affair
Meteor
Avalanche
Black Sunday
McNamara's Band
Satan's School for Girls
My Name is John
The Power
7 Faces of Dr. Lao (Academy Special Effects Nomination)
Wonderful Worlds of the Brothers Grimm
The Time Machine (Two Academy Special Effects Awards)
Tom Thumb (Academy Special Effects Award)
Around the World Under the Sea
Atlantis, The Lost Continent
Master of the World
The Lost Balloon
Jack the Giant Killer
Voyage to the 7th Planet
McHale's Navy
That Funny Feeling
Goliath and the Dragon
Spartacus
The Warlords
The King and I
Andromeda Strain
Can Can
The One With the Fuzz
Four Horsemen of the Apocalypse
The Crow

Television series
The Man from Atlantis (Four two-hour episodes and 13 one-hour episodes)
Star Trek (Pilot and miscellany)
Outer Limits (Pilot and 45 episodes)
Twilight Zone (Pilot and 6 episodes)

== Documentaries ==
Gene Warren appeared in the George Pal documentary titled The Fantasy Film Worlds of George Pal (1985) (produced and directed by Arnold Leibovit).

Mr. Warren was a guest in the documentary Time Machine: The Journey Back (1993) Produced and Directed by Clyde Lucas
