= The Time Machine (1960 film) =

1960 film by George Pal

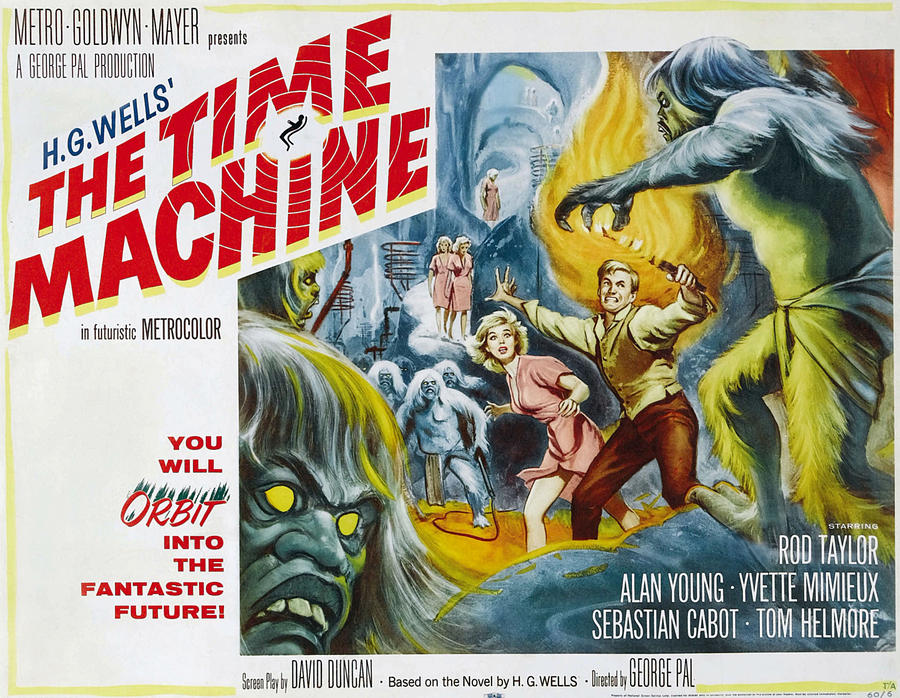
- Theatrical release half-sheet display poster by Reynold Brown
- Directed by: George Pal
- Screenplay by: David Duncan
- Based on: The Time Machine; 1895 novel by H. G. Wells
- Produced by: George Pal
- Starring: Rod Taylor; Alan Young; Yvette Mimieux; Sebastian Cabot; Whit Bissell
- Narrated by: Rod Taylor
- Cinematography: Paul C. Vogel
- Edited by: George Tomasini
- Music by: Russell Garcia
- Production companies: Metro-Goldwyn-Mayer; Galaxy Films
- Distributed by: Loew's, Inc.
- Release date: August 17, 1960
- Running time: 103 minutes
- Country: United States
- Language: English
- Budget: $829,000 or $827,000
- Box office: $2.61 million

The Time Machine (also marketed as H. G. Wells' The Time Machine) is a 1960 American period post-apocalyptic science fiction film based on the 1895 novella of the same title by H. G. Wells. It was produced and directed by George Pal, and stars Rod Taylor, Yvette Mimieux, and Alan Young. The story is set in Victorian England and follows an inventor who constructs a machine that enables him to travel into the distant future. Once there, he discovers that mankind's descendants have divided into two species, the passive, childlike, and vegetarian Eloi and the underground-dwelling Morlocks, who feed on the Eloi. It received the Academy Award for Best Special Effects for its time-lapse photographic effects, which show the world changing rapidly as the time traveler journeys into the future.

== Plot ==
On January 5, 1900, four friends arrive for a dinner at the London home of their inventor friend George. He is absent, then suddenly appears, bedraggled and exhausted. He recounts what happened to him.

At the group's earlier dinner on New Year's Eve, George stated that time is the fourth dimension. He shows David Filby, Dr. Philip Hillyer, Anthony Bridewell, and Walter Kemp a scale model time machine. When a tiny lever on it is pressed, the device quickly disappears. George claims it went forward in time, but his friends are skeptical. The group leaves, though Filby reluctantly stays behind, sensing George is not himself. George then retires to his private laboratory that holds a full-size time machine.

George travels forward in time, first in small increments, and then to September 1917 during World War I. He meets Filby's son, James, who says Filby died in the war. George returns to the time machine and stops in June 1940 during the Blitz, finding himself in the midst of World War II. A disillusioned George then travels to August 1966. People are rushing to fallout shelters as air raid sirens are blaring. An elderly James Filby urges George to take cover. George barely makes it back to his time machine as a satellite-borne nuclear weapon detonates, destroying London and causing a local volcano to erupt and bury the ruins. The approaching lava rises, cools, and hardens, trapping George as he travels far into the future, waiting for the rock to erode. Eventually the lava wears away, revealing a lush, unspoiled landscape.

George stops on October 12, 802,701, near the base of a sphinx. He encounters young men and women wearing simple clothing gathered by a stream. One woman, carried off by the current, screams for help. When her complacent companions do nothing, George rescues her. She is named Weena and her people are the Eloi; they do not operate machines, work, or read, and know little of their history. Their food is always provided for them. One young man shows George a library, but the books crumble to dust when touched. Outraged, he decides to leave, but his machine has been dragged inside the closed sphinx. Weena, who stays with him, says that Morlocks are responsible, noting they only emerge at night. A hideous-looking Morlock jumps out and grabs Weena, but is warded off by George's lit torch.

The next day, Weena shows George truncated cone structures dotting the landscape. They are air shafts leading to the Morlocks' subterranean caverns. Weena also shows George an ancient museum where "talking rings" (when spun) tell of a long-ago war between East and West that lasted 326 years and contaminated the atmosphere with "deadly germs", rendering the air virtually unbreathable. Another ring describes humanity's struggle for survival; many people lived underground, while some eventually returned to the surface. George realizes this was the beginning of the speciation that resulted in the Morlocks and Eloi. He starts to climb down a shaft, but stops when sirens emerge and blare from the sphinx. The Eloi fall into a trance-like state and head for the opened doors at the sphinx's base. The sirens stop and the doors close, trapping Weena and others inside, while those outside merely walk away.

George enters the caverns through an air shaft. He discovers that the Morlocks breed the Eloi as food. He finds Weena and fights off the creatures, finally inspiring the Eloi to defend themselves. George sets fires and urges the Eloi to climb to the surface. He directs them to drop tree branches down the shafts. The resulting fires cause the caverns to burn, then collapse.

The next morning, the sphinx's doors are open. George sees his time machine inside. When he enters the sphinx, the doors close and George is attacked by Morlocks. He escapes in his machine and returns to 1900.

After George recounts his story, his friends remain skeptical. He produces a flower Weena gave him, and Filby, an amateur botanist, says it is an unknown species. George bids his guests good evening. Filby returns shortly thereafter to find George and his time machine gone. His housekeeper, Mrs. Watchett, notes that nothing is missing except three books that she is unable to identify. Filby speculates that George has returned to the distant future to help the Eloi build a new civilization. When Mrs. Watchett wonders if George will ever return, Filby remarks that "he has all the time in the world".

== Cast ==
- Rod Taylor as H. George Wells
- Alan Young as David Filby/James Filby
- Yvette Mimieux as Weena
- Sebastian Cabot as Dr. Philip Hillyer
- Tom Helmore as Anthony Bridewell
- Whit Bissell as Walter Kemp
- Doris Lloyd as Mrs. Watchett
- Paul Frees as voice of the Rings (uncredited)

== Production ==
=== Pre-production ===
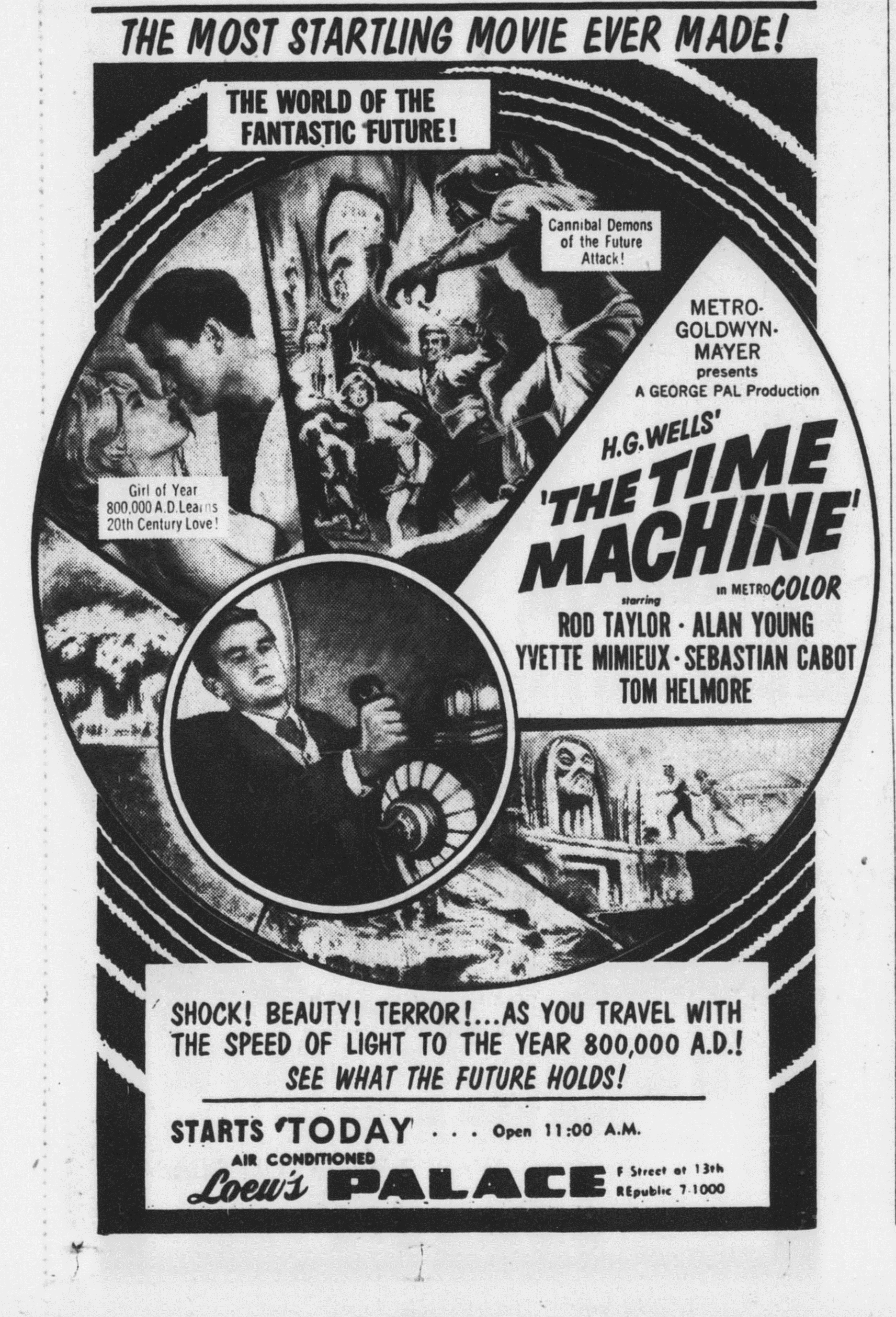
Theatrical advertisement from 1960

George Pal was already known for his pioneering work with stop-motion animation, having been nominated almost yearly for an Oscar during the 1940s. In 1958, Pal was approached by Shiro Kido to co-produce a Japanese adaptation of the novel with Shochiku Productions. After Kido left the project and Pal was unable to sell Hollywood on the concept of the film, he found MGM's British studio (where he had filmed Tom Thumb) open to his proposal.

The name of the film's main character (alluded to in dialogue only as "George") connects him both with George Pal and with the story's original science fiction writer H. G. (George) Wells. The name "H. George Wells" can be seen on a brass plaque on the time machine. The film was created on a tight budget and given a filming schedule of just 29 days.

=== Casting ===
Taylor was already Pal's first choice to play the time traveller, after having lunch together numerous times where they discussed the project. Taylor admitted being fascinated with Pal's rough drawings detailing various scenes. In a 1986 interview, he commented how he had been asked more questions about his role in this film than any other across his career. Pal originally considered casting a middle-aged British actor like David Niven or James Mason as George. He later changed his mind and selected the younger Australian actor Rod Taylor to give the character a more athletic, and more realistic when it came to fighting the Morlock scenes. It was Taylor's first lead role in a feature film.

Mimieux was cast in the role of Weena despite having no previous acting experience. During a screen test, director George Pal observed an innocent persona she portrayed, yet despite being his first choice, she was turned down by MGM. Following Pal's insistence and despite Taylor's preferred choice being Shirley Knight, Mimieux was asked back for another screen test where she was offered the part. Taylor observed her inability to act, describing how he thought she was like "kind of a strange hippie child" and was concerned that her lack of experience meant she would be difficult to act alongside. Mimieux lied about her age to Pal, stating she was 18 despite being only 17 when filming began. Having initially struggled on set, Mimieux gradually improved as her confidence in acting grew, to the extent that Pal requested that some of her earlier scenes be reshot to take advantage of her improved acting ability.

=== Design ===
The time machine prop was designed by MGM art director Bill Ferrari and built by Wah Chang. Recognized today as an iconic film property, Ferrari's machine suggested a sled made up of a large clockwork rotating disk. The disk rotated at various speeds to indicate movement through time, evoking both a spinning clock and a solar disk. In a meta-concept touch, a brass plate on the time machine's instrument display panel identifies its inventor as "H. George Wells", though the Time Traveler is identified only as "George" in dialogue. In Wells's original story, the protagonist is referred to only as the "Time Traveler".

As a means to cut costs, the dome habitat of the Eloi was constructed without a ceiling so that natural light could be used instead of costly artificial lighting.

The look of the Morlocks was designed by Wah Chang.

=== Filming ===
With a budget of under $1 million, the film could not be shot on location in London. Live-action scenes were filmed from May 25 to June 30, 1959, in Culver City, California, with the backgrounds often filled in with matte paintings and models. Some of the costumes and props were re-used from Forbidden Planet (1956), such as the Civil Defence air raid officer uniform, which was the C-57-D crew uniform, and the large acrylic sphere in the talking rings room, a prop from the C-57-D's control bridge.

In scenes where lava is shown to overrun the streets of London onto a miniature replica set, oatmeal was used as a substitute. The oatmeal had been prepared several days prior and left over a weekend, where it fermented in high temperatures, creating a "foul stench" in the air when it was released.

== Home media ==
Released multiple times on Beta and VHS video cassette, Capacitance Electronic Disc (CED), and both letterboxed and open matte LaserDisc, the film was released on DVD in October 2000 and on Blu-ray Disc in July 2014 from Warner Home Video.

== Soundtrack ==
An original film score CD was released in 1987 produced by Arnold Leibovit, the original soundtrack recording was composed and conducted by Russell Garcia himself and released by GNP Crescendo. Arnold Leibovit Entertainment produced and re-released a new updated stereo digital remaster in 2022 with expanded tracks and uncut as composer Garcia originally wrote it. Included is a 20-page collector's booklet with an exclusive interview with Garcia. The track listing is as follows:

No.	Title	Length
1.	"Main Title / Credits"	1:55
2.	"London 1900 (Filby's Theme)"	2:40
3.	"Time Machine Model"	0:47
4.	"The Time Machine"	1:57
5.	"Quick Trip Into The Future"	2:43
6.	"All The Time In The World"	0:33
7.	"Beautiful Forest / The Great Hall"	2:10
8.	"Fear"	1:31
9.	"Weena (Love Theme)"	1:46
10.	"Rescue"	2:08
11.	"Reminiscing"	2:12
12.	"Morlocks"	2:24
13.	"End Title (Reprise)"	1:16
14.	"Fight With The Morlocks"	3:33
15.	"Time Traveler"	2:26
16.	"Escape"	3:31
17.	"Prayer / Off Again"	1:41
18.	"Trapped In The Future"	2:18
19.	"Love And Time Return"	2:33
20.	"End Title"	2:13
21.	"Atlantis, the Lost Continent (Overture): Main Title/Credits/Love Theme/Night Scene/Submarine/End Title"	6:59

== Critical reception ==
The Time Machine received generally mixed reviews upon release. Bosley Crowther of The New York Times wrote a mixed review, praising the "familiar polish and burnish" of the production values but finding that "the drama, for all its invention, is creaky and a bit passé. (Apparently there has still been no contact with other planets in 800,000 A.D.) And the mood, while delicately wistful, is not so flippant or droll as it might be in a fiction as fanciful and flighty as this one naturally is". A generally positive review in Variety praised the special effects as "fascinating" and wrote that "Rod Taylor definitely establishes himself as one of the premium young talents on today's screen", but faulted the pacing of the film, finding that "things slow down to a walk" once the protagonist arrives in the far distant future. Harrison's Reports called the film "an excellent science-fiction melodrama ... jammed full of suspense, action and out-of-this-world special effects", although the review lamented a lack of comic relief. Whitney Balliett of The New Yorker wrote in a negative review that the film "converts this good simple-minded material into bad simple-minded material", by including such Hollywood touches as a love interest. He was also unimpressed by the production values, writing that the model sets "don't touch the lowest-price Lionel train". Richard L. Coe of The Washington Post wrote that with the exception of the "gooey" love interest, "the tale is an engrossing one, boasting adroit camera tricks by Paul C. Vogel and an exceptionally easy, likable performance of the Time Traveler by Taylor. The youngsters will like this, and their elders will be kept wide awake". The Monthly Film Bulletin wrote that the film was "at its best in the scenes where George explores his new surroundings at each time stop", but found the acting "inadequate: Rod Taylor lacks both intellect and period sense, belonging more to an American science fiction world, and Weena is just a doll. Nevertheless, Pal's visual flair and genuine feeling for his fantasy world help to maintain an entertaining surface for most of the time".

On review aggregator Rotten Tomatoes, the film holds a score of 77% based on 39 reviews. The website's critics consensus reads, "Its campy flourishes tend to subdue its dramatic stakes, but The Time Machine brings H.G. Wells' story to life with plenty of sci-fi charm and a colorful sense of visual design." On Metacritic, the film has a weighted average score of 67 out of 100 based on nine critics, indicating "generally favorable reviews".

== Box office ==
According to MGM records, the film earned $1,610,000 in the United States and Canada and $1 million elsewhere, turning a profit of $245,000.

The film had admissions of 363,915 in France. Kine Weekly called it a "money maker" at the British box office in 1960.

== Awards and honors ==
Gene Warren and Tim Baar won the 1961 Academy Award for Best Effects, Special Effects.

The film was nominated for the 1961 Hugo Award for Best Dramatic Presentation.

== Comic book adaptation ==
- Dell Four Color #1085 (March 1960)

== 1993 documentary ==
In 1993, a combination sequel-documentary short, Time Machine: The Journey Back, directed by Clyde Lucas, was produced. In its third section, Michael J. Fox talks about his experience with the DeLorean sports car time machine from Back to the Future. In the short's final section, written by screenwriter David Duncan, Rod Taylor, Alan Young, and Whit Bissell reprise their roles from the original 1960 film.

== In pop culture ==
- Time After Time, a 1979 science-fiction film in which H. G. Wells (played by Malcolm McDowell) travels to modern-day San Francisco in his time machine in pursuit of Jack the Ripper.
- The Time Machine, a 2002 remake directed by Simon Wells and an uncredited Gore Verbinski, and starring Guy Pearce in the Taylor role.
- The Quantum Leap episode "Future Boy", which takes place on October 6, 1957, features a character who builds a time machine very similar to that used in Pal's film.
- In "The Nerdvana Annihilation", a 1st season episode of The Big Bang Theory, the characters purchase a scaled-down replica of the film's time machine at an online auction site, only to discover that it is full-size; Morlocks later haunt Sheldon's dreams of time-traveling to the far future.
- "Journey to the Bottom of the Crash Pit", a 5th season episode of Regular Show, in which Mordecai, Rigby, Muscle Man, and Hi-Five Ghost have to venture into the bottom of the crash pit to find their video camera before their boss Benson notices it is gone; the Carlocks they meet are based on the Morlocks from the H. G. Wells novel and their appearance is based on the Morlocks in Pal's film.
- In Gremlins, at the inventors' convention, the time machine can be seen in the background with a man sitting in it and the disk spinning. In the next shot, it has disappeared, leaving a cloud of smoke.
