= Arnold Leibovit =

American film director (born 1950)

- Born: June 18, 1950 (age 76); Miami Beach, Florida, United States
- Occupations: Film director, producer, screenwriter

Arnold Leibovit (born June 18, 1950) is an American director, producer, and screenwriter of feature films and musical productions.

== Life and career ==
An acting member of the Producers Guild of America, he has produced, directed, and written several feature films. As part of his career, he has devoted over 40 years to the work of George Pal. Leibovit produced the biopic The Fantasy Film Worlds of George Pal, for which he received a CINE Golden Eagle Award in the Arts category in 1986 and The George Pal Memorial Award (also known as the Saturn Award) from The Academy of Science Fiction Fantasy and Horror Films in 1987. In addition, he produced other works focusing on Pal including The Puppetoon Movie, in addition to restoring the original films under license from Paramount Pictures, who lent Leibovit the original camera negatives.

In 2002 he served as the executive producer for The Time Machine. Leibovit had earlier obtained the rights to the H.G. Wells book and the 1960 MGM motion picture through the George Pal estate. This film was produced under the direction of Wells' great-grandson Simon Wells.

Arnold Leibovit was born and raised in south Florida, a child of Hungarian ancestry. Leibovit became interested in Pal and his movies and, as he embarked on his career in filmmaking, Pal rose to the top of his interests. In 1985, he produced the first and only filmed documentary of the life of George Pal.

== Selected filmography ==
- (1975) Penny Lane (writer, director)
- (1980) Rascal Dazzle (associate director, editor)
- (1985) The Fantasy Film Worlds of George Pal (writer, director, producer)
- (1987) The Puppetoon Movie (writer, director, producer)
- (2002) The Time Machine (executive producer)
