= Jock of the Bushveld (disambiguation) =

Jock of the Bushveld is a novel by Percy FitzPatrick.

Jock of the Bushveld may also refer to:

- Jock of the Bushveld (1986 film), an adaptation of the novel
- Jock the Hero Dog, (also known as Jock of the Bushveld), a 2011 South African-American animated comedy film loosely based on the novel
