= Covered wagon =

Canvas-covered horse or ox wagons

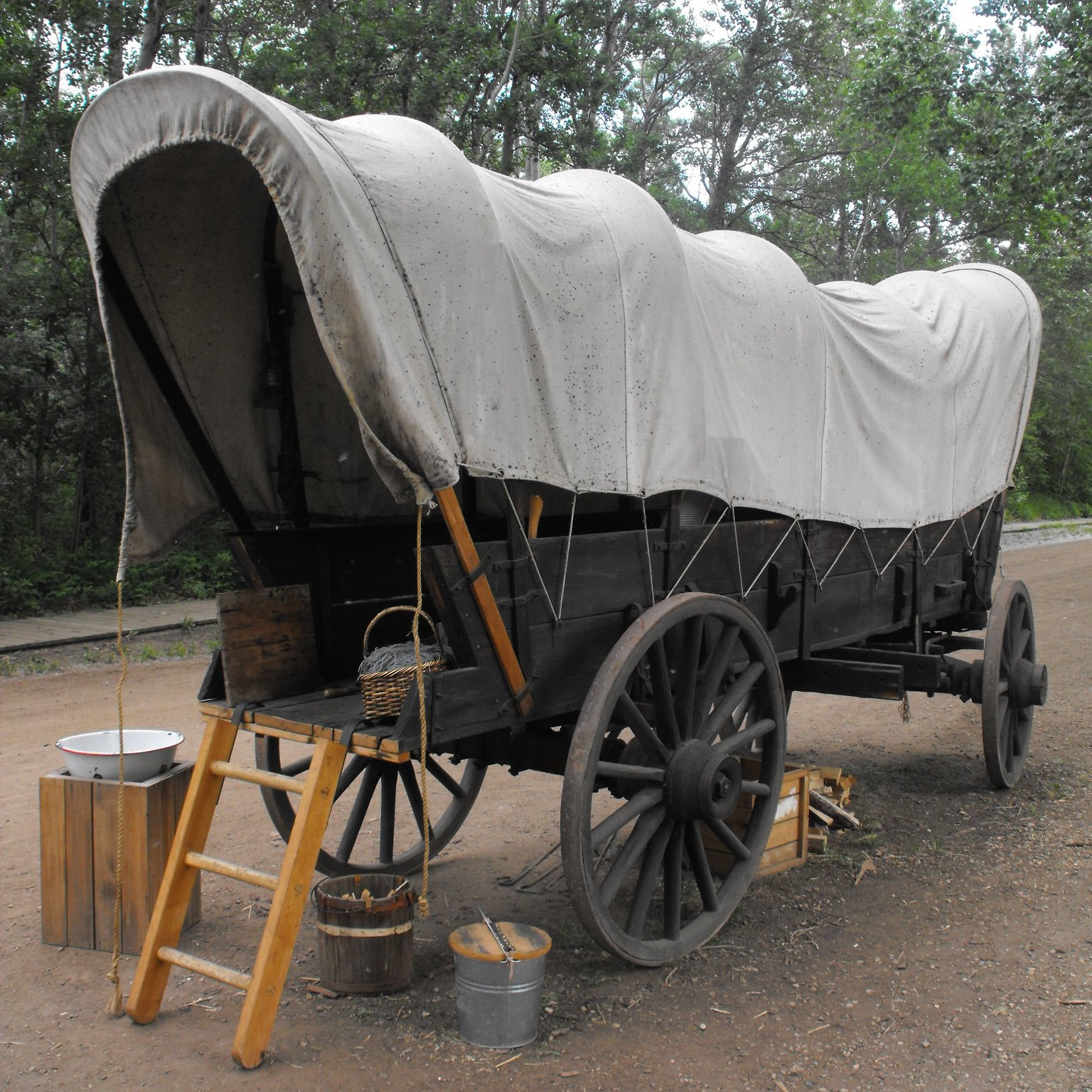
Narrow covered wagon used by west-bound Canadian settlers c. 1885

A covered wagon, also called a prairie wagon, whitetop, or prairie schooner, is a horse-drawn or ox-drawn wagon used for passengers or freight hauling. It has a canvas, tarpaulin, or waterproof sheet which is stretched over removable wooden bows (also called hoops or tilts) and lashed to the body of the wagon. They were a popular style of vehicle for overland migrations.

== Conestoga wagon ==
The Conestoga wagon is a heavy American wagon of English and German type, in use from the late 18th century and into the 19th century. It was used for freight and drawn by teams of horses or oxen depending on load. The covered canvas top is supported on eight to twelve angled bows, rather than upright ones. Capacity is around 4 to 5 tons and it has no springs. Though it is boat-shaped, it does not float. It was used in eastern North America for freight hauling, with some used for southward migration through the Appalachian valleys and along the Great Wagon Road. It was too heavy for use west of the Mississippi River; the westward wagons were lighter, and more angular or square.

Conestoga wagons

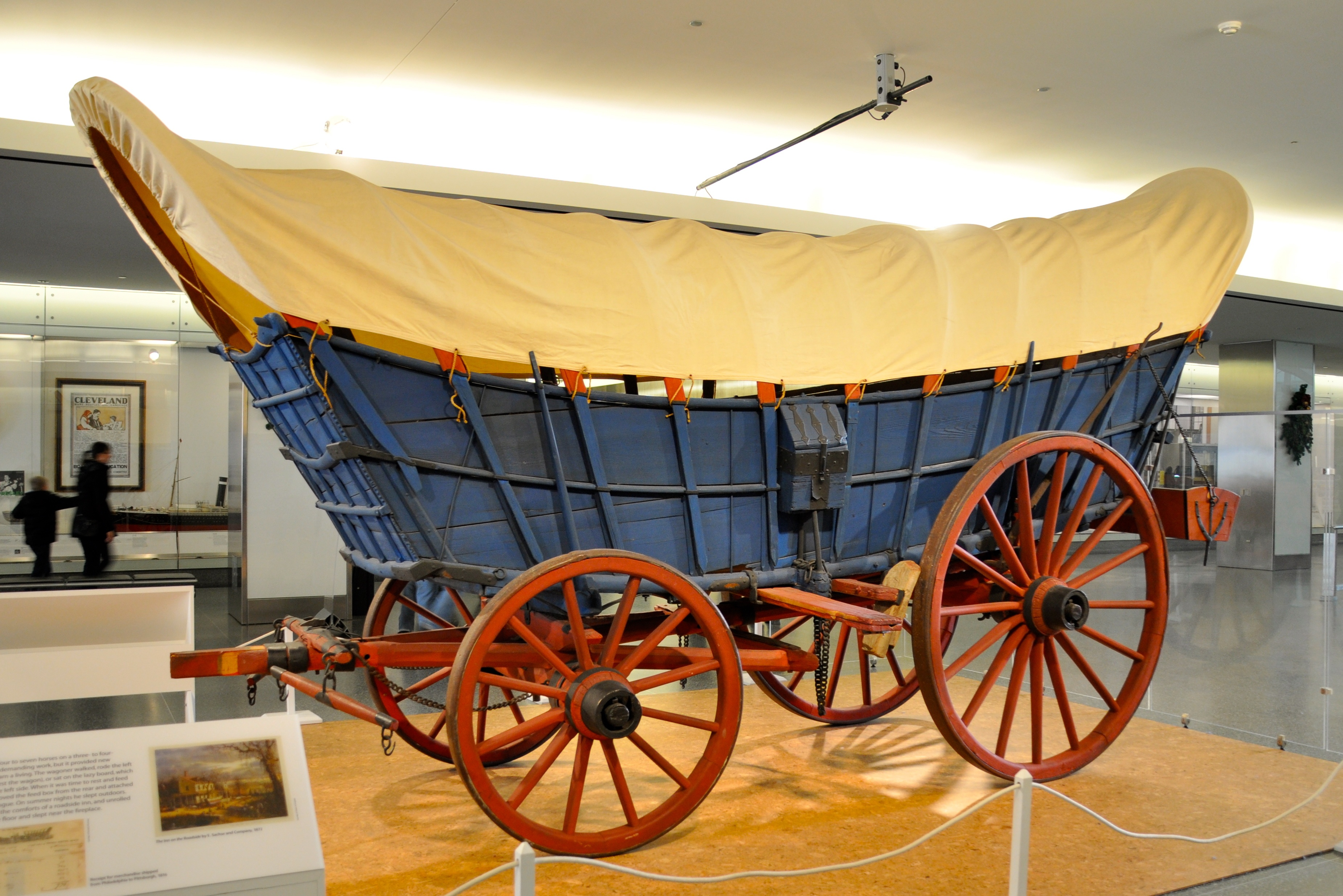
Conestoga in a museum

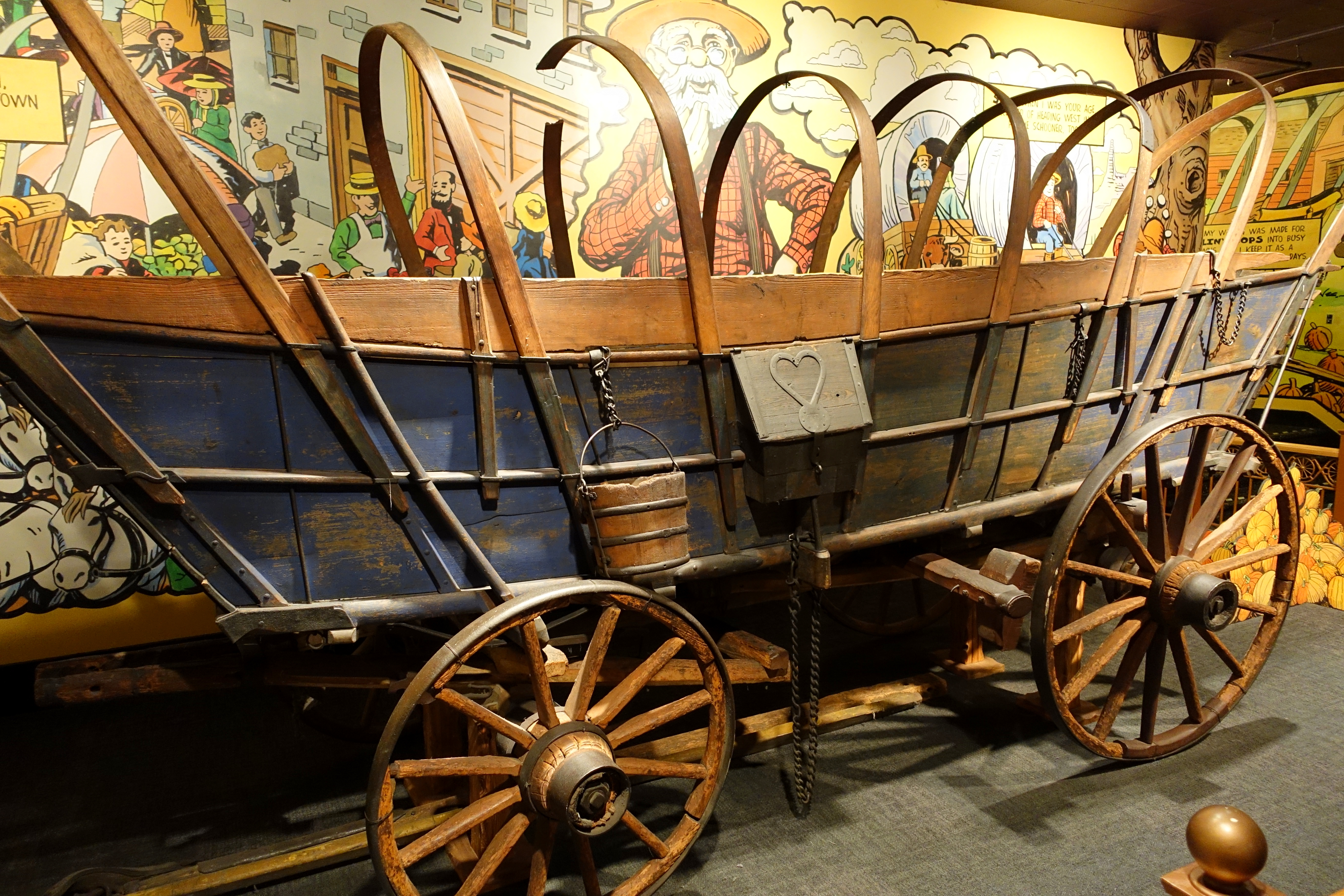
Shows framework and bows

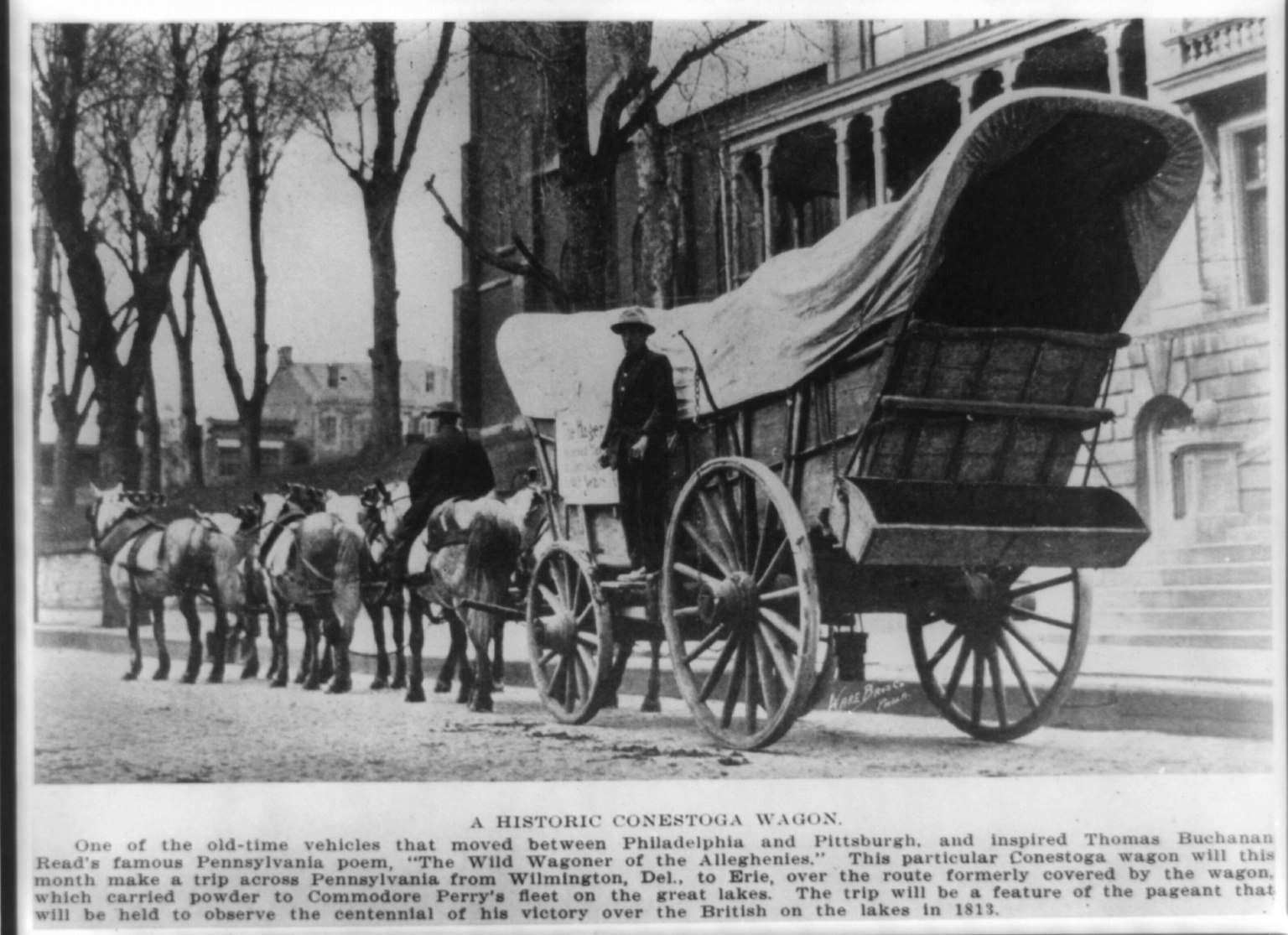
Freight Conestoga

== America westward migration ==
From the early 1840s through the 1860s, the United States saw large numbers of emigrant families traveling westward across the prairies and along the overland trails. Most emigrants followed one of several westward expansion trails, departing from Missouri River towns each spring, and faced journeys of around 2,000 miles (3,200 km), traveling 10–20 miles (16–32 km) per day. The Conestoga wagon was too heavy for the long westward migrations, and rarely went west of the Missouri River, though some were used as freighters on the Santa Fe Trail. The primary vehicles for westward migrations were farm wagons with a bed about 10 feet (3.0 m) long, 4 feet (1.2 m) wide, and sides 2 feet (0.61 m) high. They had five or six bows, over which was draped a light-colored cover of canvas, twill, or similar fabric. Oxen were the most common animal used for pulling covered wagons, although mules and horses were also used. Authors of guidebooks written for emigrants noted that oxen were more reliable, less expensive, and nearly as fast as other options.

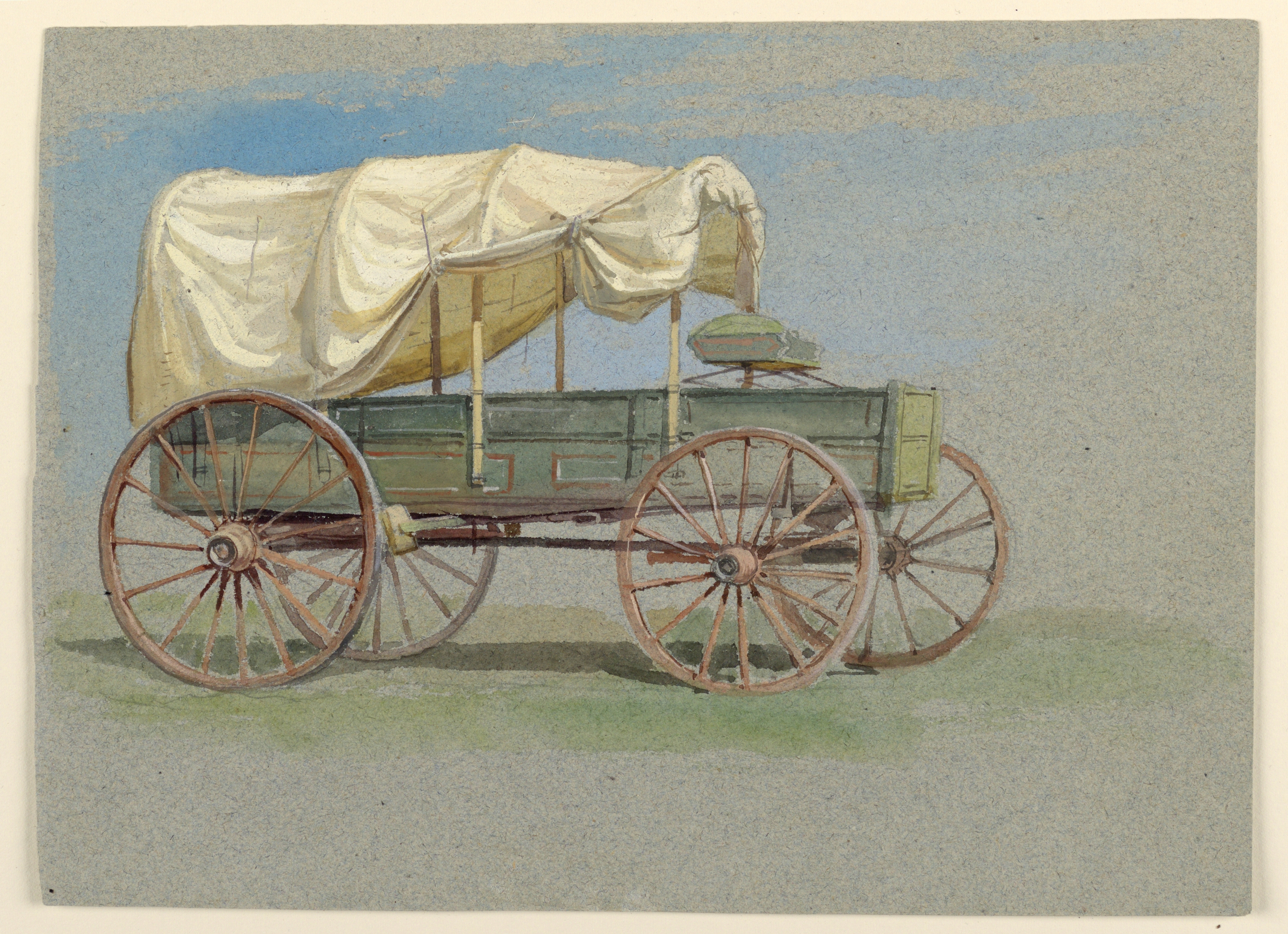
Covered wagon c. 1870s

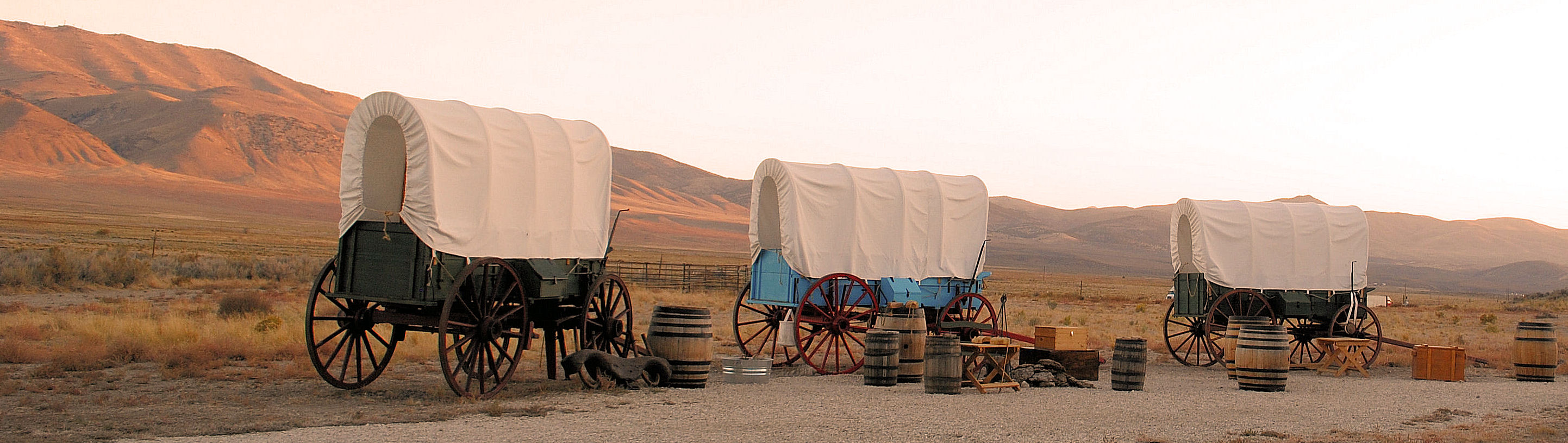
Covered wagons at California Interpretive Center in Elko, Nevada

=== Prairie schooner ===
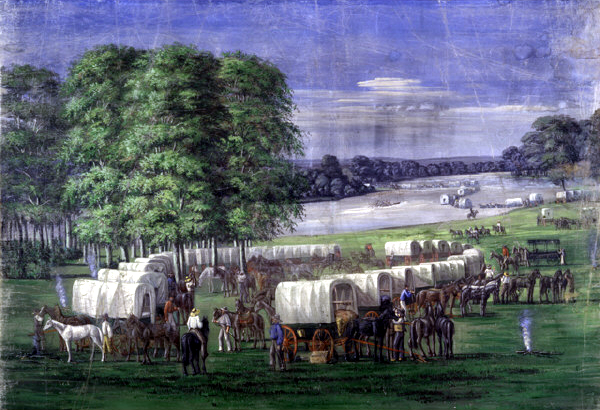
Painting of a wagon train of covered wagons

Prairie schooner is a metaphorical name for the covered wagon, inspired by the way its white canvas cover resembled the sails of a ship crossing a sea of prairie grass.

On all the prairie the white-covered wagon was the only sign of human life. It was visible as far as a sail would have been upon the lake, and the prairie, with its graceful undulations that had once been its bottom, waving now with grass, was not unlike the water's surface. A "prairie schooner" was what the settlers called such a wagon.

— William Eleazar Barton in The Prairie Schooner: A Story of the Black Hawk War

[A Prairie schooner is an] American emigrant wagon of light/medium weight and dimensions. Headed by a canvas top supported on bow-shaped hoops or tilts. Either sprung or dead axle, up to a capacity of 3 tons. Lever brakes acted on both rear wheels. Drawn by either two or four horses in pole gear. First came to prominence during the gold rush period of the 1840’s. Not to be confused with the much larger Conestoga Wagon.

— D.J.M. Smith in A Dictionary of Horse Drawn Vehicles

== South Africa Great Trek ==
During the Great Trek starting in 1836, Dutch-speaking settlers in South Africa travelled by wagon trains, migrating northward from British-ruled areas in search of their own homeland. Mostly pulled by pairs of oxen, the Boer trek wagon has a long wheel-base with the sides higher at the rear in typical Dutch fashion. The ox-wagon had a felt or canvas top supported by bowed hoops.

Voortrekker covered wagons

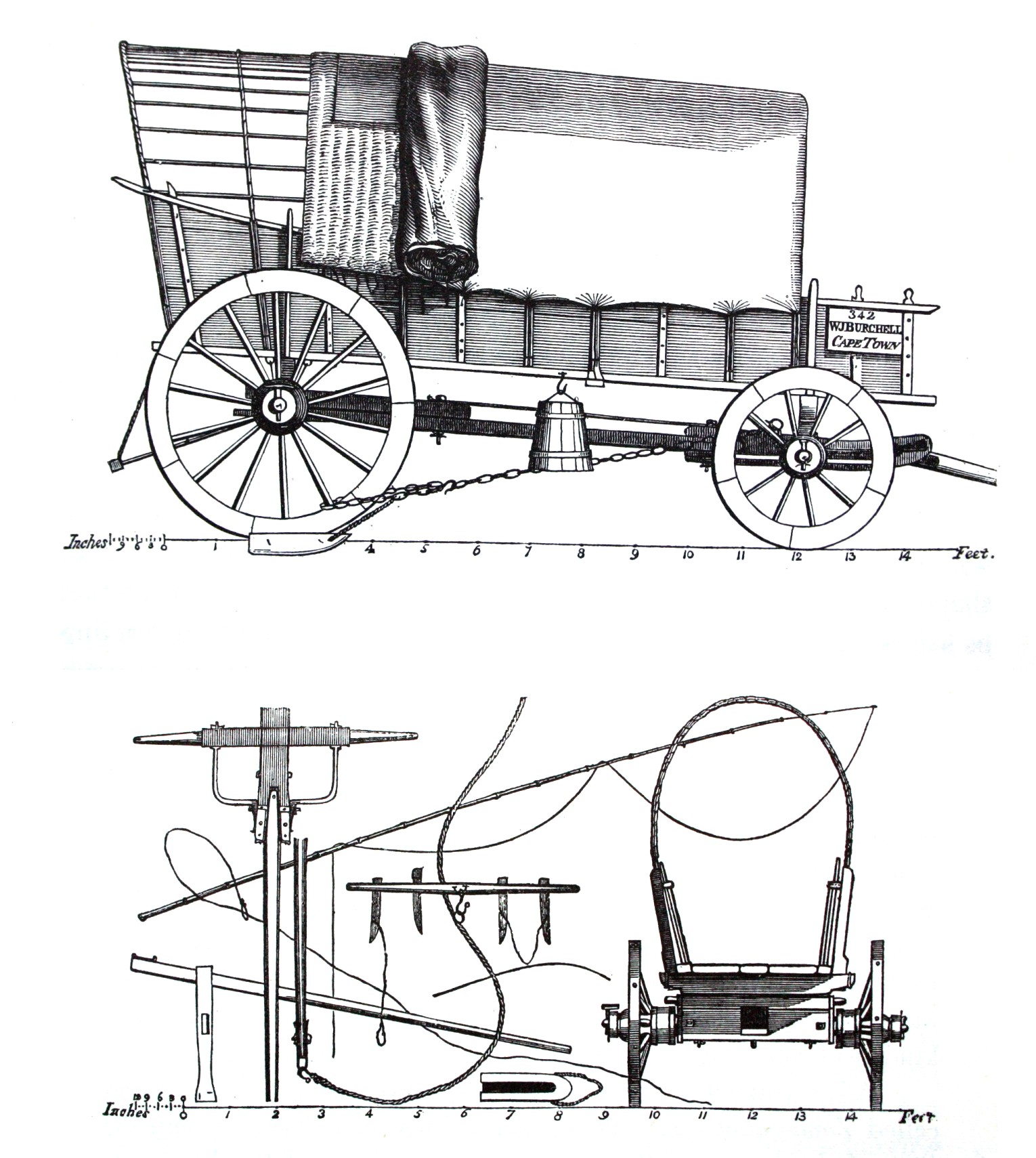
Diagram of wagon and fittings

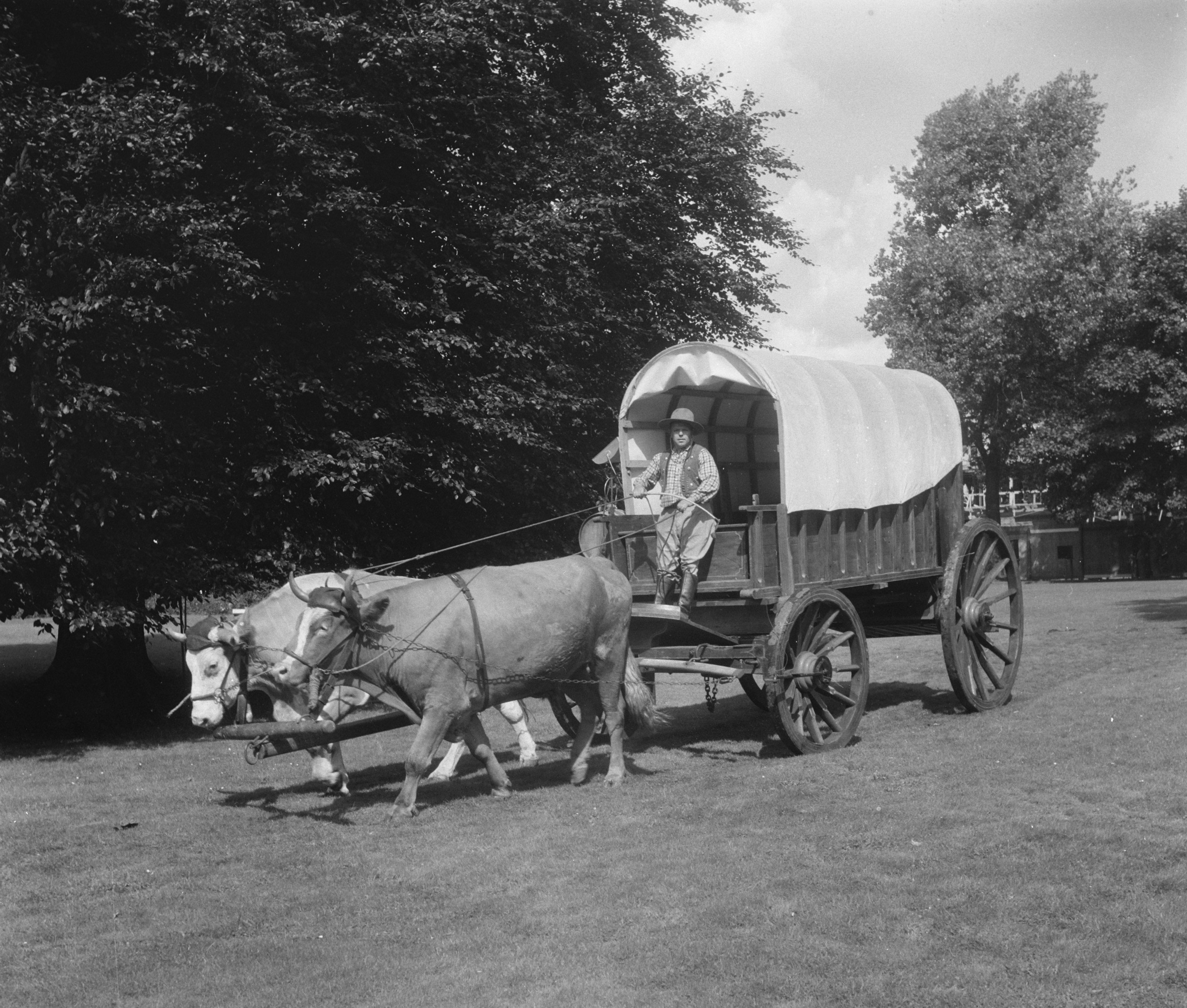
Almost exclusively pulled by oxen

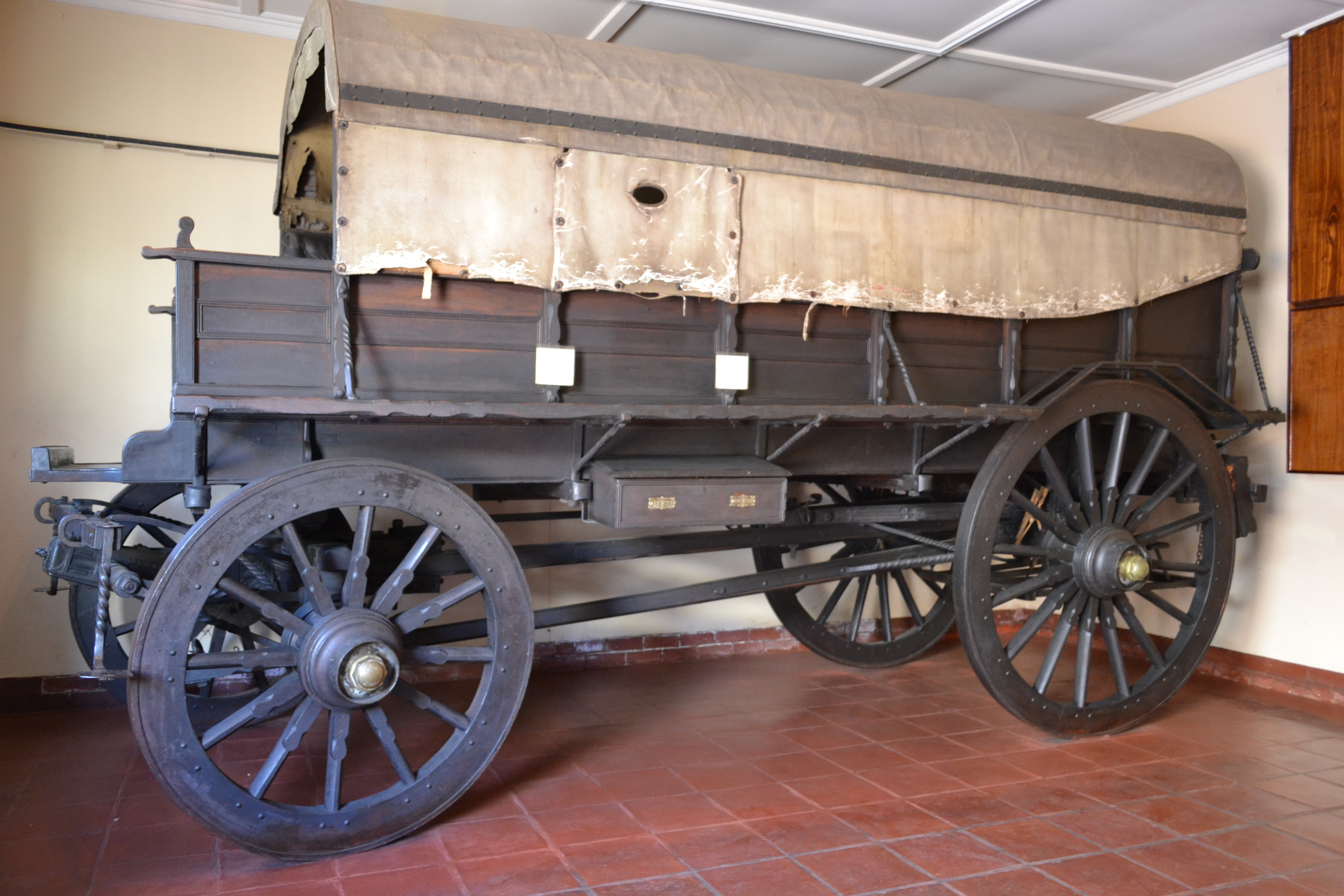
Voortrekker wagon in museum

== Bow-top vardo ==
A bow top wagon

Also called a barrel top wagon, the bow top has low side walls with a barrel-shaped roof of canvas or cotton duck stretched over wood "tilts" (curved bows of wood). It was traditionally painted green with teal-coloured fabric so it would blend in with a forest background. It is light enough for a single horse to pull, and is less likely to overturn in a strong wind than the straight-sided vardo designs. The front and back walls of the wagon may be elaborately decorated with paint and scrollwork. It has an open layout inside which includes a stove, table, and double bed. The open-lot variation of the bow top doesn't have a closed front wall and doors, but is open and may have a curtain for privacy. The canvas can be folded back in warm weather.

== Modern excursion wagons ==
Modern wagons are used for excursions for group outings or camping. The interior of camping wagons are used for sleeping and food preparation, while wagons for group excursions typically have two long bench seats along the sides of the wagon with a long table in the middle. Smaller wagons can often be converted into a wagonette by removing the canvas and framework. In Germany, this type of wagon is called a kremser, and in the Netherlands a janplezier.

Modern excursion wagons

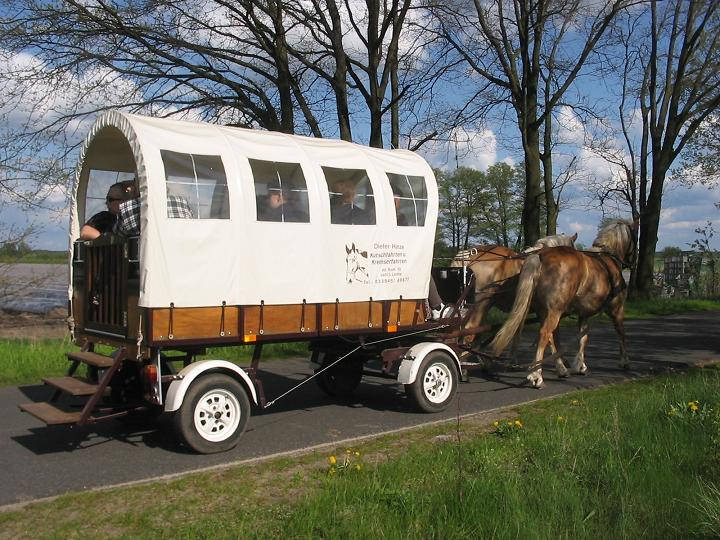
Wagon for group outings

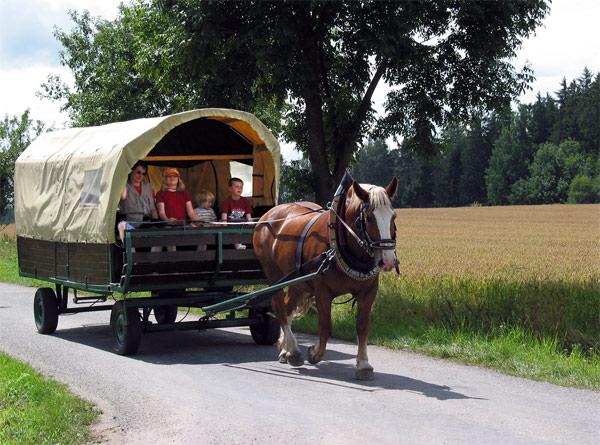
Wagon for camping

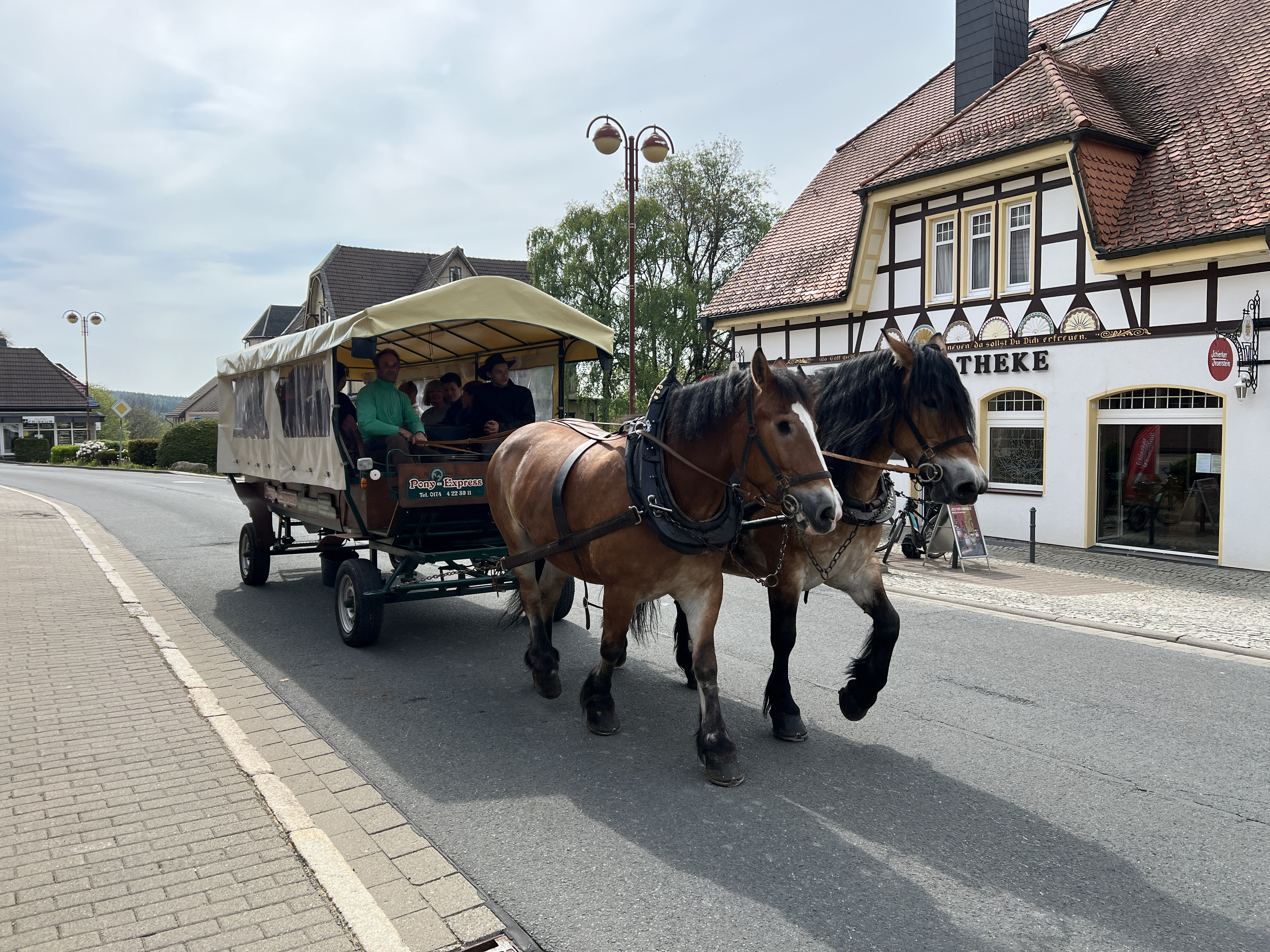
Kremser (Germany)

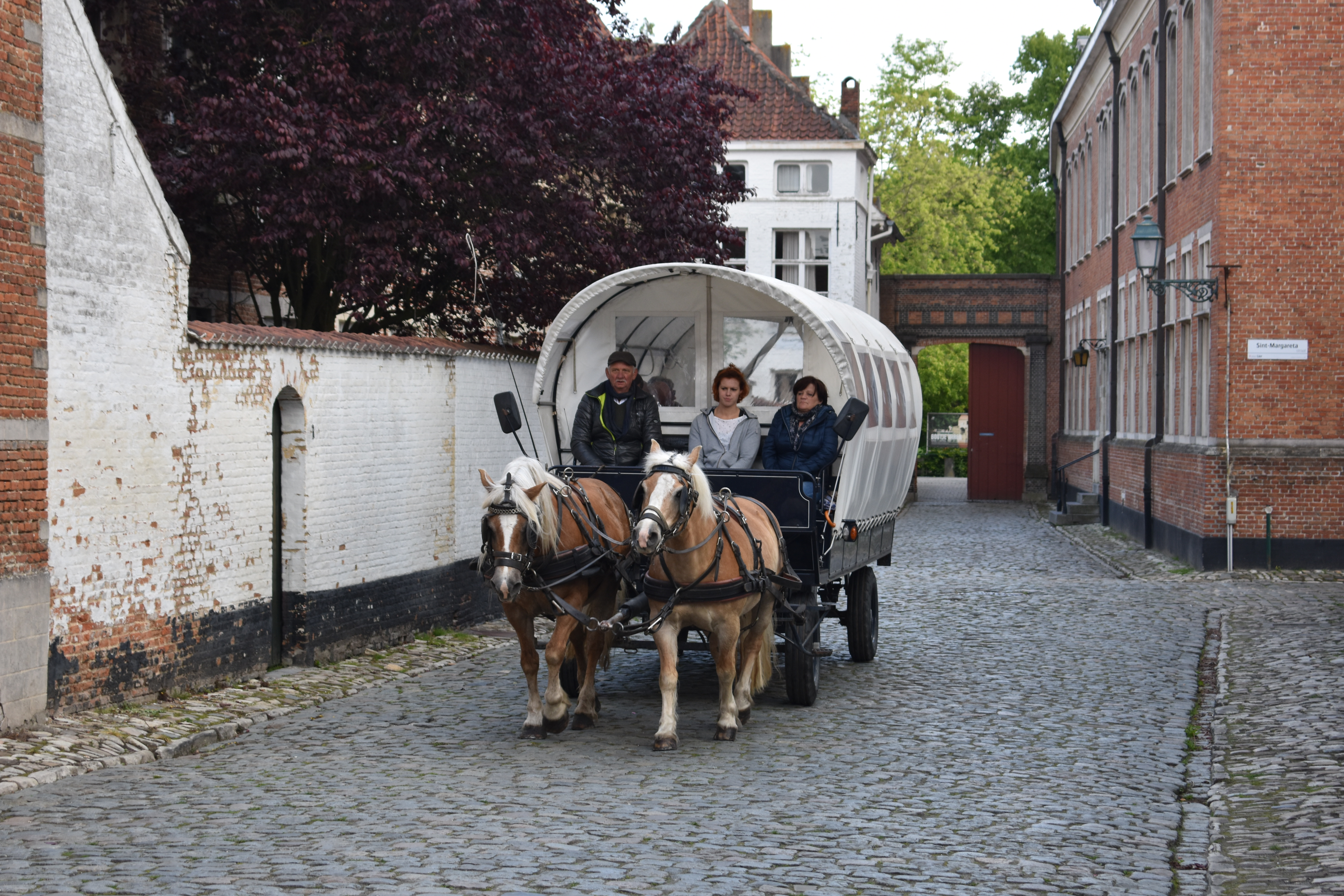
Janplezier (Netherlands)

== Freight ==
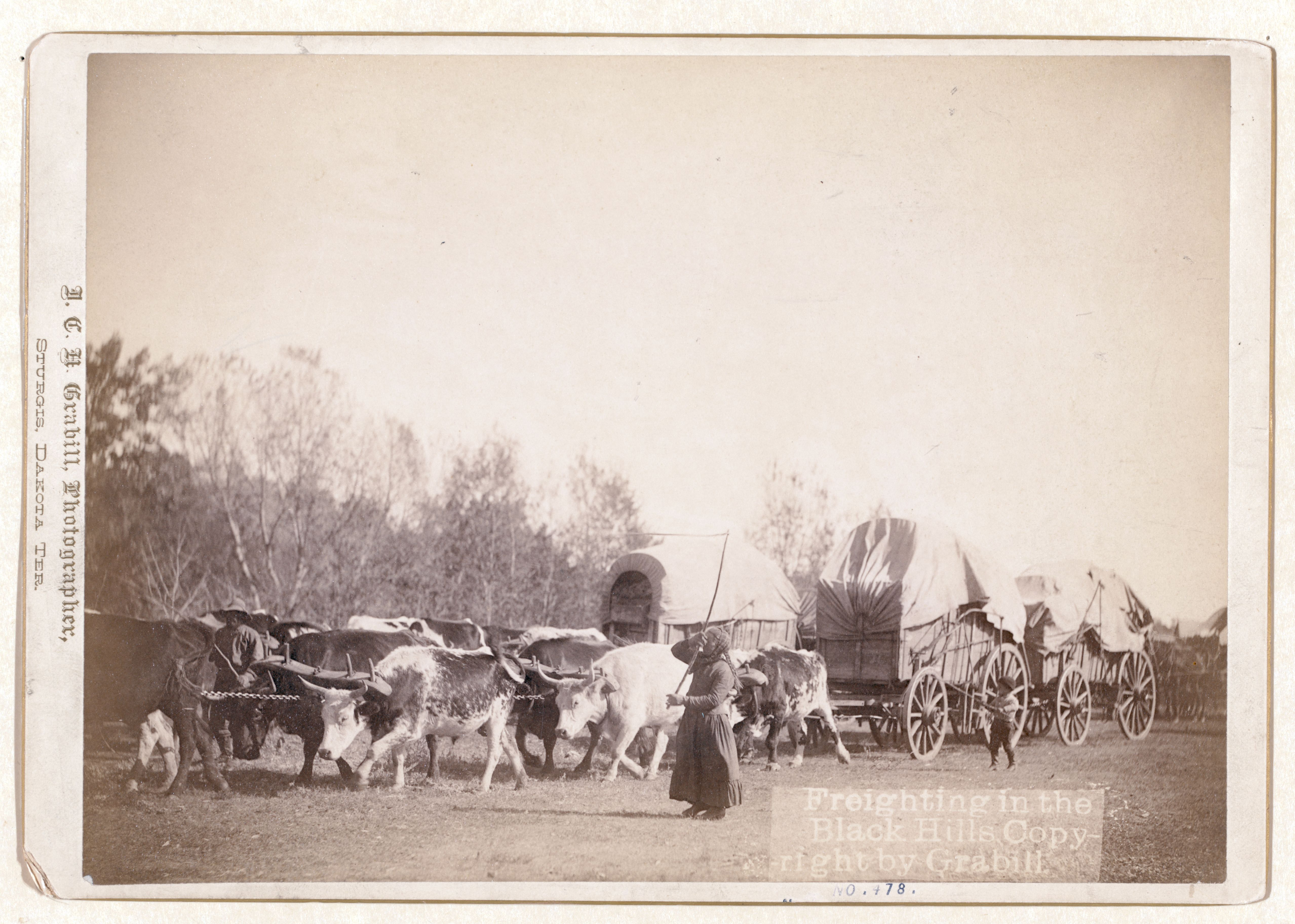
Oxen teams pulling double-wagons

Before railroads in early America, ox-teams and wagons were used to haul overland freight, sometimes in great wagon trains of 10 to 60 teams. Each team of 5 to 7 yoked pairs of oxen pulled two wagons—a lead wagon (averaging 6,500 pounds [2,900 kg]), which pulled a trailer wagon (4,000 pounds [1,800 kg]).

Military have used covered wagons for transport of supplies. Called "baggage wagons" during the American Revolutionary War, in one account British commander Henry Clinton had a baggage train of 1,500 wagons that stretched 12 miles long.

== See also ==
- Ox-wagon
- Vardo (Romani wagon)
- Wagon
