= Jock of the Bushveld =

Book by James Percy FitzPatrick

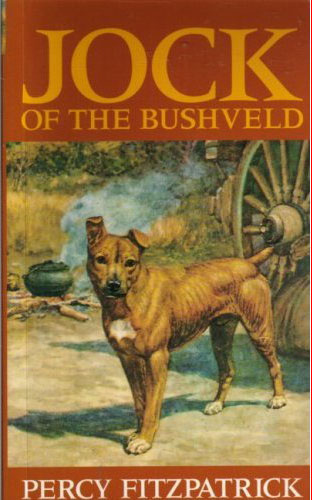
- Author: Percy FitzPatrick
- Illustrator: Edmund Caldwell
- Cover artist: Edmund Caldwell
- Language: English, translated into Afrikaans, Dutch, French, Xhosa, Zulu, and others.
- Subject: Jock of the Bushveld
- Published: 1907
- Publisher: Longmans, Green, and Co
- Publication date: 1907
- Publication place: South Africa
- Media type: Hardback
- Pages: 475
- ISBN: 978-1463788421
- OCLC: 559436

Jock of the Bushveld is a true story by South African author Sir James Percy FitzPatrick. The 1907 book tells of FitzPatrick's travels with his dog, Jock, a Staffordshire Bull Terrier cross, during the 1880s, when he worked as a storeman, prospector's assistant, journalist and ox-wagon transport-rider in the Bushveld region of the Transvaal (then the South African Republic).

== Early life ==
Jock's mother Jess was the only dog in their camp. FitzPatrick describes her as "an unattractive bull-terrier with a dull brindled coat–black and grey in shadowy stripes. She had small cross-looking eyes and uncertain always-moving ears; she was bad tempered and most unsociable", but everybody respected her. Jock's father is only described as an imported dog in the book and there's an ongoing debate on whether he was an American Staffordshire Terrier or of a breed like the bull and terrier.

FitzPatrick describes the puppies: "Five of the litter were fat strong yellow chaps with dark muzzles—like their father. The sixth one was about half the size of the others. He wasn't yellow like the others, nor dark brindled like Jess, but a sort of dirty pale half-and-half colour with dark faint wavy lines all over him; and he had a dark little muzzle." Since the runt had not been spoken for, Percy slowly came upon the idea of taking him on as his own. He called him Jock and it seemed as if the puppy knew that FitzPatrick was his master from day one. He even followed him home without any coaching.

== Reputation ==
This was the start of an adventure. Eventually, the puppy grew into a dog. He was well liked and orderly. He lived with Percy loyally, and his memory inspired many bedtime stories from Percy's three children. Once FitzPatrick had made his fortune, he settled down to have a family, and became an established and well-respected person that he began to write his stories. By the request of his children, he published his stories.

FitzPatrick gave Jock to a friend until he had a safer place for him to live in the town, where with his deafness, he was unsafe from traffic and people. The friend, Ted, loaned Jock to a store-owner Tom Barnett, who was having trouble with thieves and kraal dogs.

== Publication ==
FitzPatrick later recounted these adventures as bedtime stories to his four children. Rudyard Kipling, a good friend of FitzPatrick, also took part in these story-telling evenings and eventually persuaded him to collect these tales in book form.

Jock of the Bushveld was first published in 1907 and had an extremely warm reception, being reprinted four times in that year alone. Since then it has achieved the status of a classic South African book and has been also widely read abroad – more than one hundred editions have been printed and it has been translated into Afrikaans, Dutch, French, Xhosa and Zulu, amongst others. Illustrations for the book were done by Edmund Caldwell, a brother of Mary Tourtel, creator of Rupert Bear.

A widely available 'modernised' South African edition published by AD Donker Publishers, according to its editor Linda Rosenberg, has been cleansed of its 'prejudicial racial references', while 'the esoteric charm and innocent philosophical tone have been left scrupulously intact'.

== Death ==
The main version of how Jock died is told as follows: When Fitzpatrick went to live in Barberton, he realised Jock was miserable living in a town and gave the dog to his friend Tom Barnett, who ran a supply store in what became Mozambique. One night when Tom Barnett called him, he mistakenly shot Jock, because he was thought to be the dog killing chickens on the farm (when Jock had meanwhile already killed the other intruding dog). See Gelert and "Faithful Hound" folk-tale motif, which lives on as an urban legend. It is classified as Aarne–Thompson type 178A.

The exact location of Jock's grave is unfortunately not officially marked or known. However, in 1947 Fitzpatrick's daughter Cecily Niven, backtracked her father's travels according to the description in "Jock of the Bushveld" and wrote about her findings in her book "Jock & Fitz" published 1968.

Mrs. Niven claimed to have located the area of the grave and stated the coordinates as: 25°46'5.0"S 32°20'4.0"E .

Any remnants of Tom Barnett's store and the wild Fig tree, under which Jock was buried and "Jock" had been carved upon, was long gone.

Fragments of building materials and broken china was uncovered at the site. Today the area is only 600m from the N4 road near Sonte, Mozambique

According to Gubbins in a letter dated 4 August 1933, the site of the fig tree bearing Jock's name, was close to the Pessene railway station. The fig tree was cleared around 1933 and he tried with the assistance of railway personnel to mark the spot. Gubbins communication is held by the University of the Witwatersrand. According to Dr Gerrit Haarhoff another older Gubbins was present during Jock's trek.

Sir Percy Fitzpatrick himself is buried at 33°28'25.2"S 25°36'21.1"E .

Since 2023 there has been added a Google Maps geo-marker for 25°46'06.7"S 32°20'18.5"E as "Jock of the Bushveld gravesite" . Some 400 meters closer to the N4, than the coordinates stated by Mrs. Niven. There is no trustworthy source given for this, yet.

== Statue ==
Percy FitzPatrick's daughter and only surviving child, Cecily Niven promoted her father's legacy in the Lowveld by erecting bronze plaques and statues at places of significance to the story of Jock. The most famous statue of Jock was sculpted by the well-known South African artist, Ivan Mitford-Barberton. It was erected on a farm in the Lowveld, but was moved to the Barberton, Mpumalanga Town Hall in 1984, during the town's centenary.

== Movies ==
Wilbur Smith adapted the book into a screenplay for a movie that was never filmed.

The book was made into a movie in 1986, starring Jonathan Rands, Gordon Mulholland and Jocelyn Broderick with Mfubu as Jock. The movie did not prove popular with American audiences however, primarily due to its sad ending. Another fictional movie with an ending that was more palatable to this audience was therefore released in 1994.

At the end of 2007 Duncan MacNeillie together with a small team of animators moved from Nelspruit to Johannesburg to start production on Jock of the Bushveld. It took a team of 25 animators 3 years to complete the film. Midway through 2009 the decision was made to complete the film in Stereoscopic. Scheduling the release of a 3D animated movie called Jock the Hero Dog on 24 July 2012, Canadian singer Bryan Adams voiced the title character.

== Criticism ==
Recent readings of the book have called for its colonial narratives to be viewed critically, especially given its racially problematic language, colonial tropes and idealization of imperialism. In the Postscript to Jock FitzPatrick refers to Tsonga people as Zulu people who have "degenerated by mixture with inferior races". Critic Stephen Gray points out that the book is an instrument of FitzPatrick's imperial values. Drew Forrest argues that the book is opposed to post-apartheid values in South Africa but maintains that it should still be available even in its unabridged form because of the value it holds in teaching lessons about this era of South African history.

== See also ==
- List of individual dogs
