= Edmund Caldwell =

British painter (1852–1930)

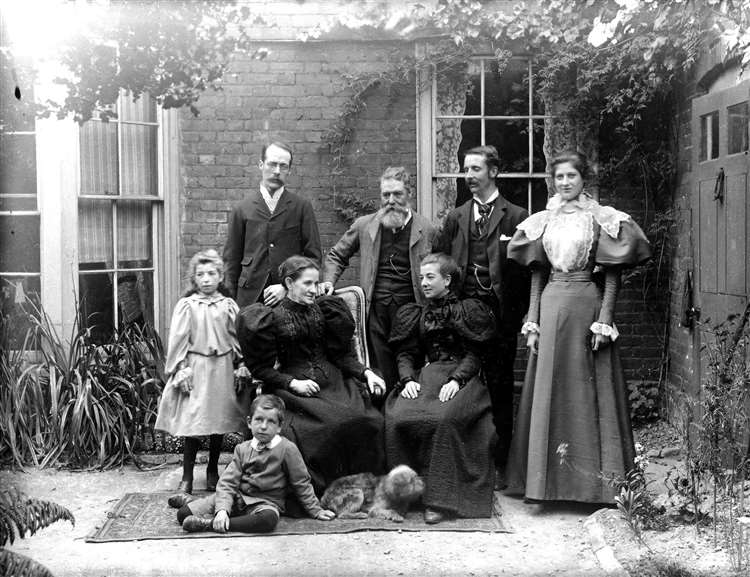
Caldwell family in Canterbury, Mary Tourtel stands on the right, Edmund stands at the left

Edmund Caldwell (21 December 1852 – 28 March 1930) was an English animal artist who produced paintings, illustrations, and etchings that were used in books on animals, wildlife, and sport hunting.

== Life and work ==
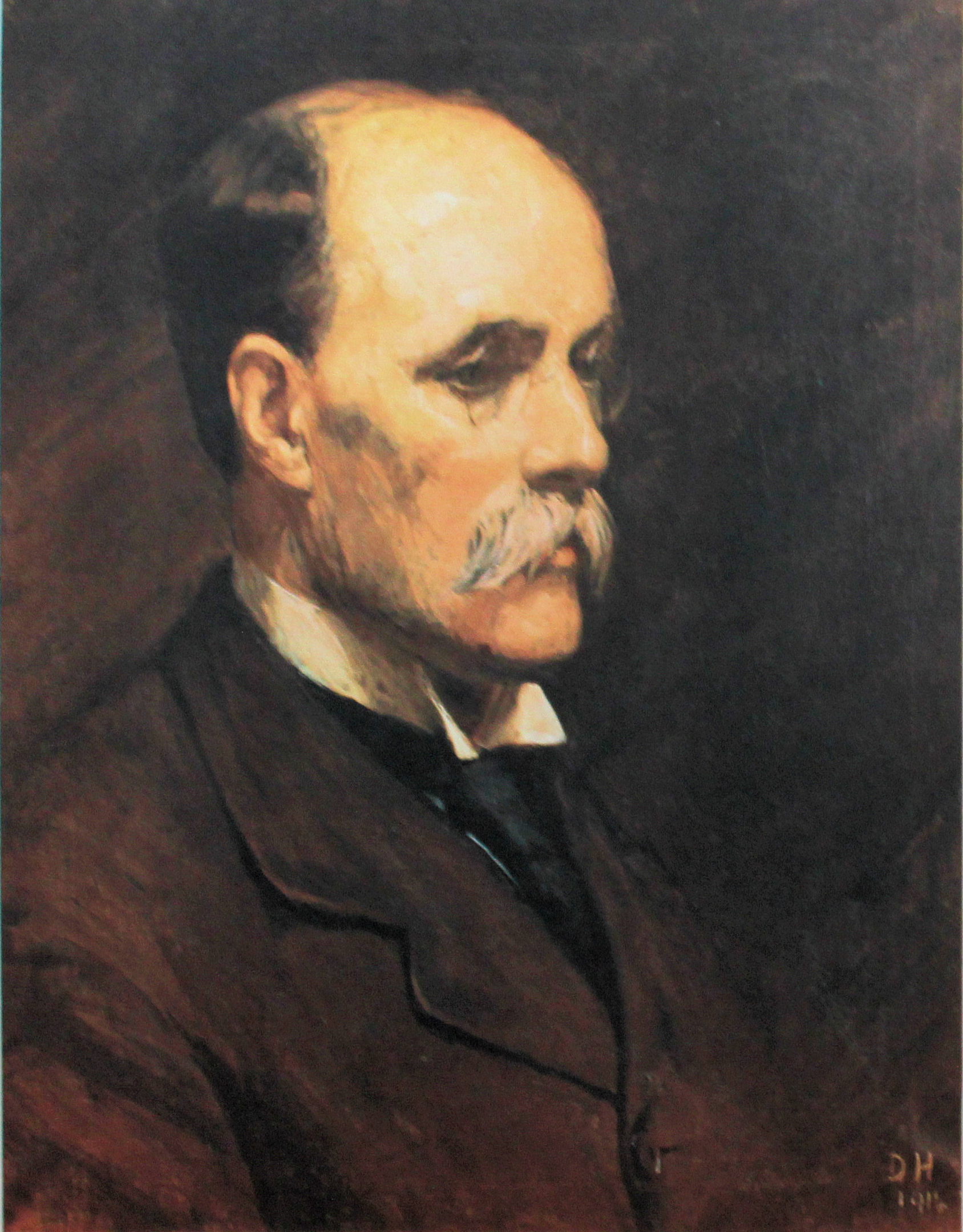
Portrait painting, 1914

Caldwell was born in Canterbury, Kent, the son of stained glass artist Samuel and Sarah née Scott. His sister Mary Tourtel (1874–1948) became famous for the comic Rupert Bear series. Edmund and Mary trained under Thomas Sidney Cooper and went to the West London School of Art. Edmund later trained in Paris at the Académie Julian under Gustave Boulanger and Jules-Joseph Lefebvre. He exhibited at the Royal Academy of Arts in 1880 to 1903. He also had exhibitions at various galleries including that of the New Watercolour Society. He established himself in London at Primrose Hill Studios, Fitzroy Road. Caldwell illustrated numerous books including those by Frederick Courteney Selous, William Robert Ogilvie-Grant, James Percy FitzPatrick, and Maud Doria Haviland. He travelled in Canada and FitzPatrick invited him to South Africa to make sketches for his book Jock of the Bushveld. Caldwell also made sculptures and illustrated for magazines such as the Illustrated Sporting and Dramatic News. He also produced bronze sculptures of animals. Some of his watercolours are held at the William Fehr Collection at the Castle of Good Hope. He was blind for the last seven years of his life.

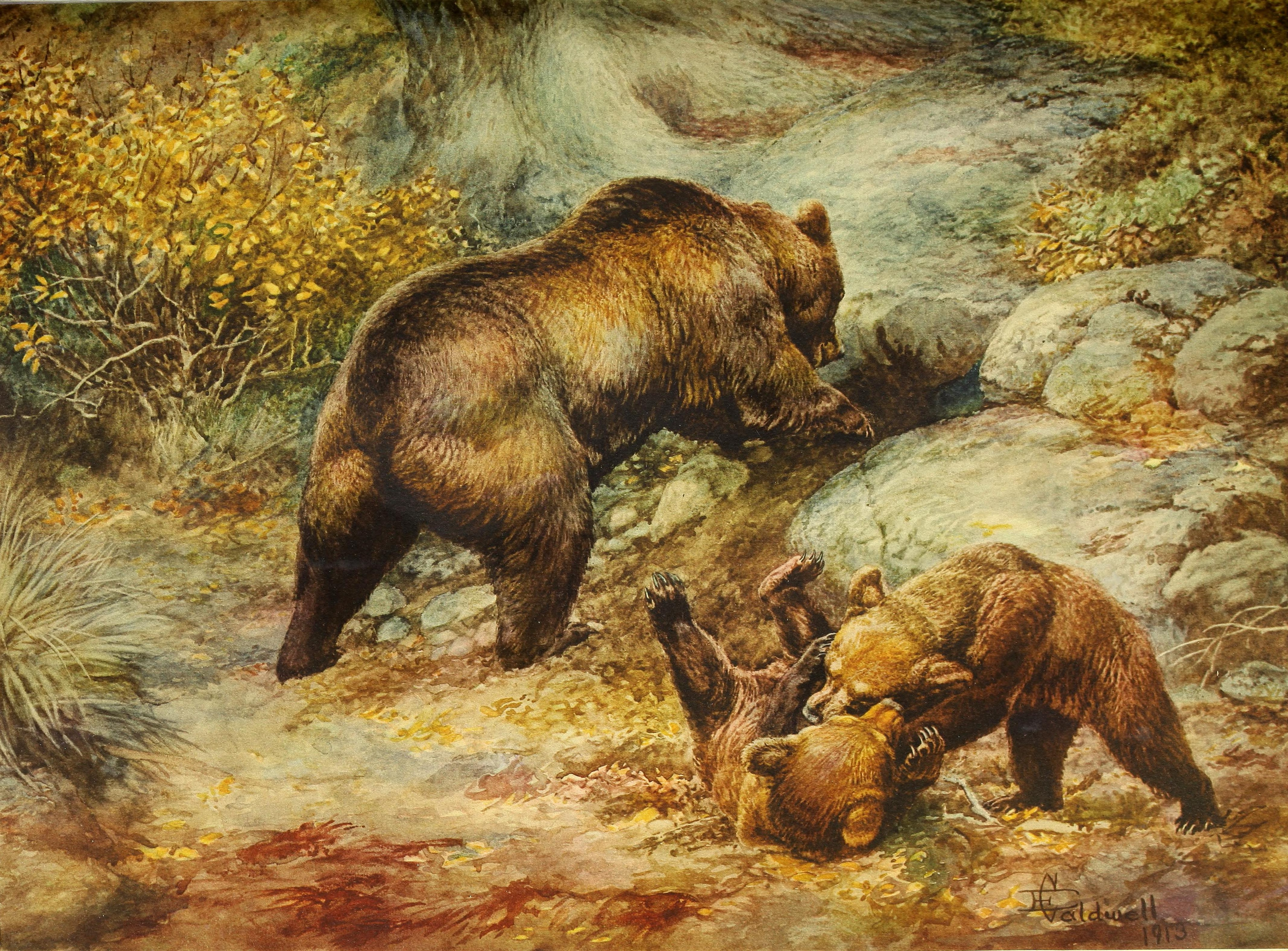

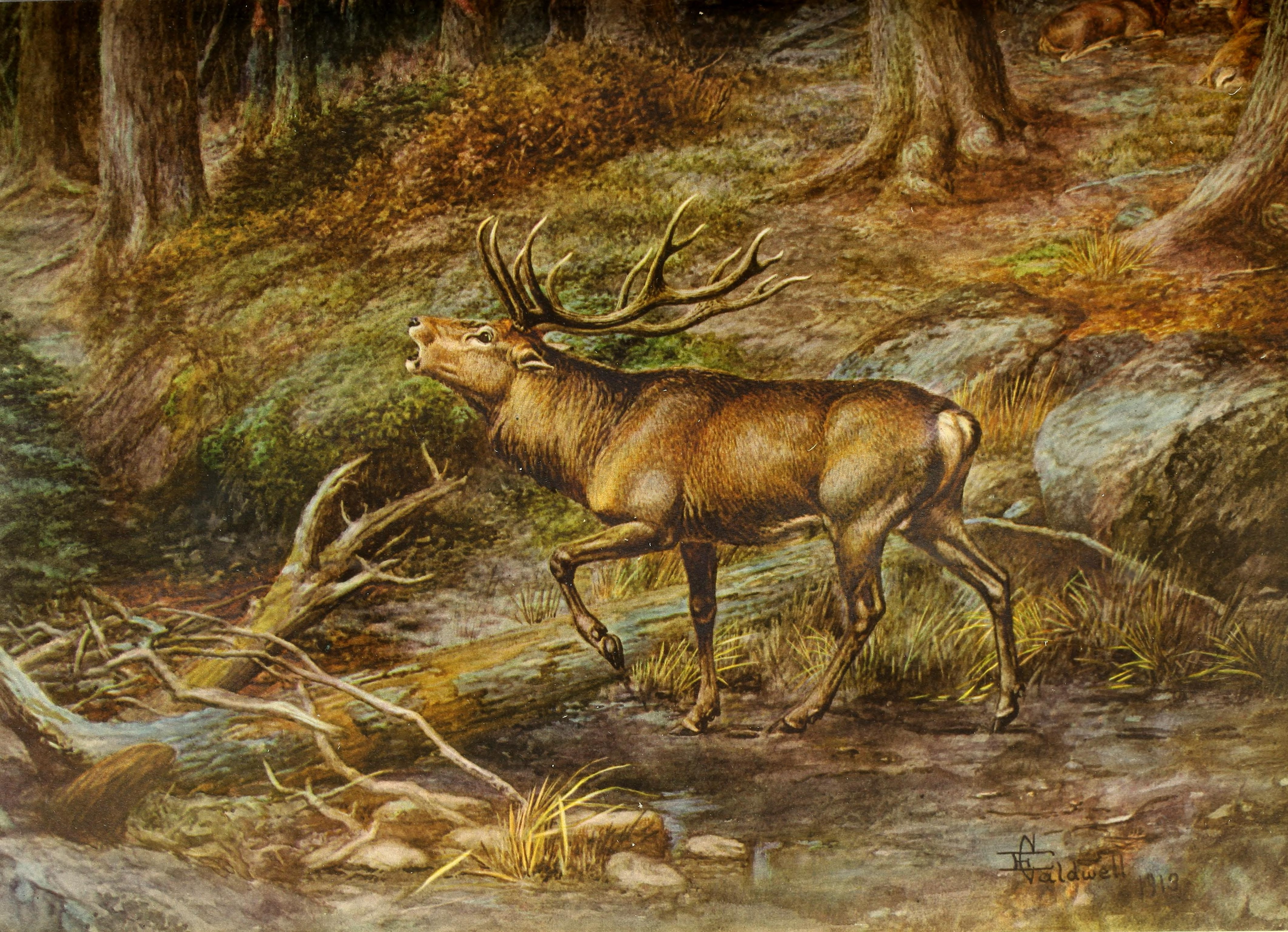

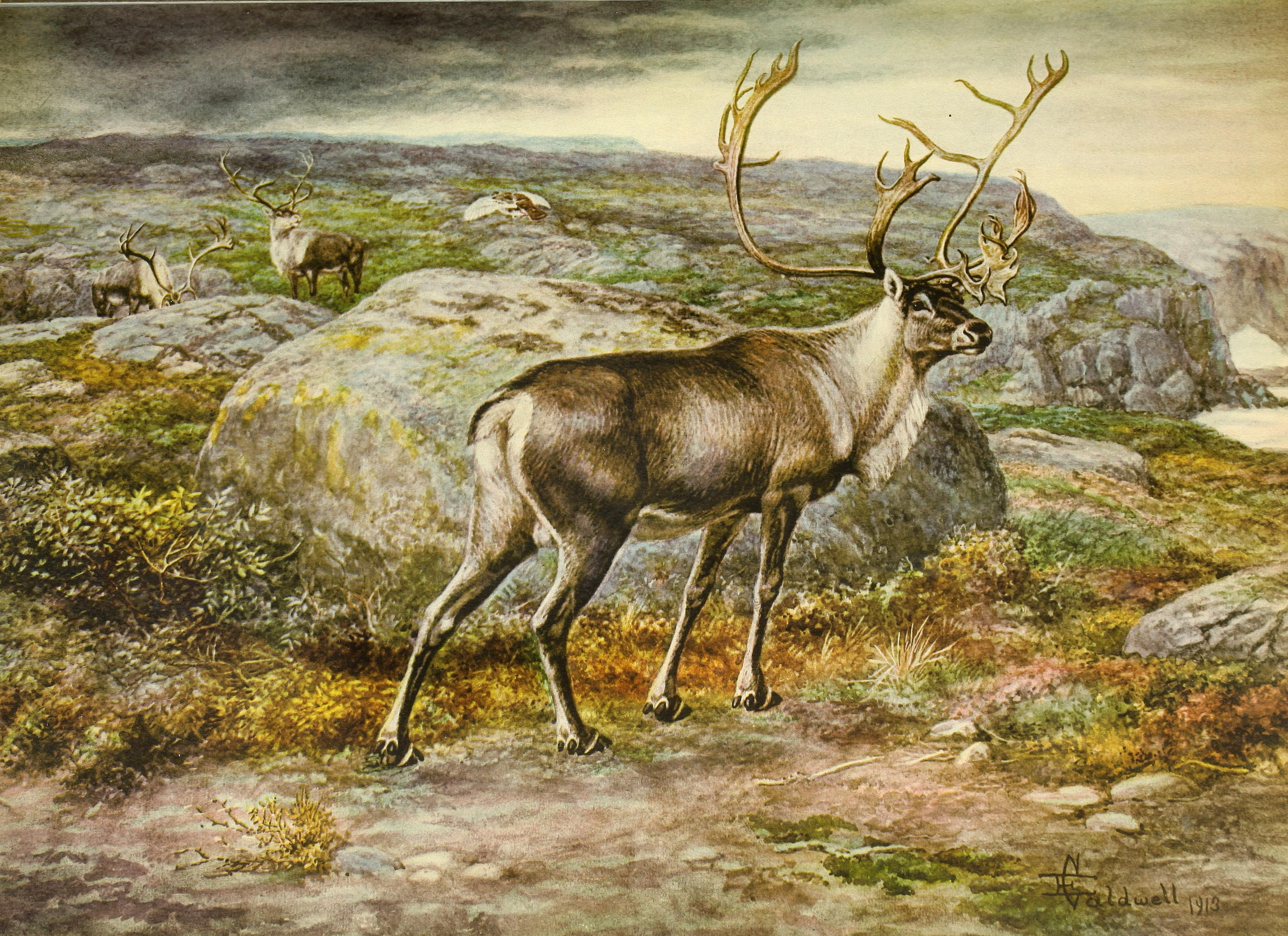

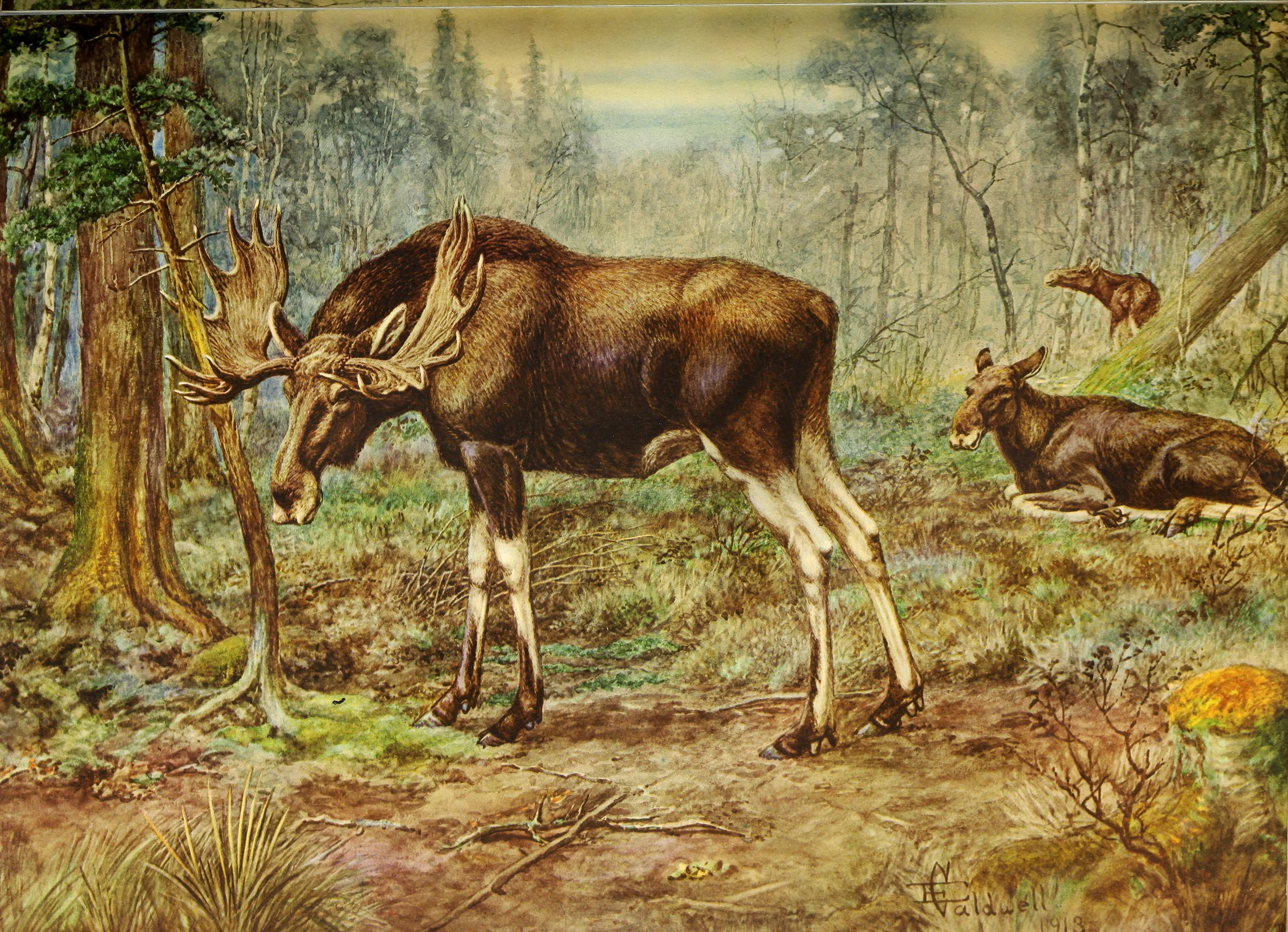

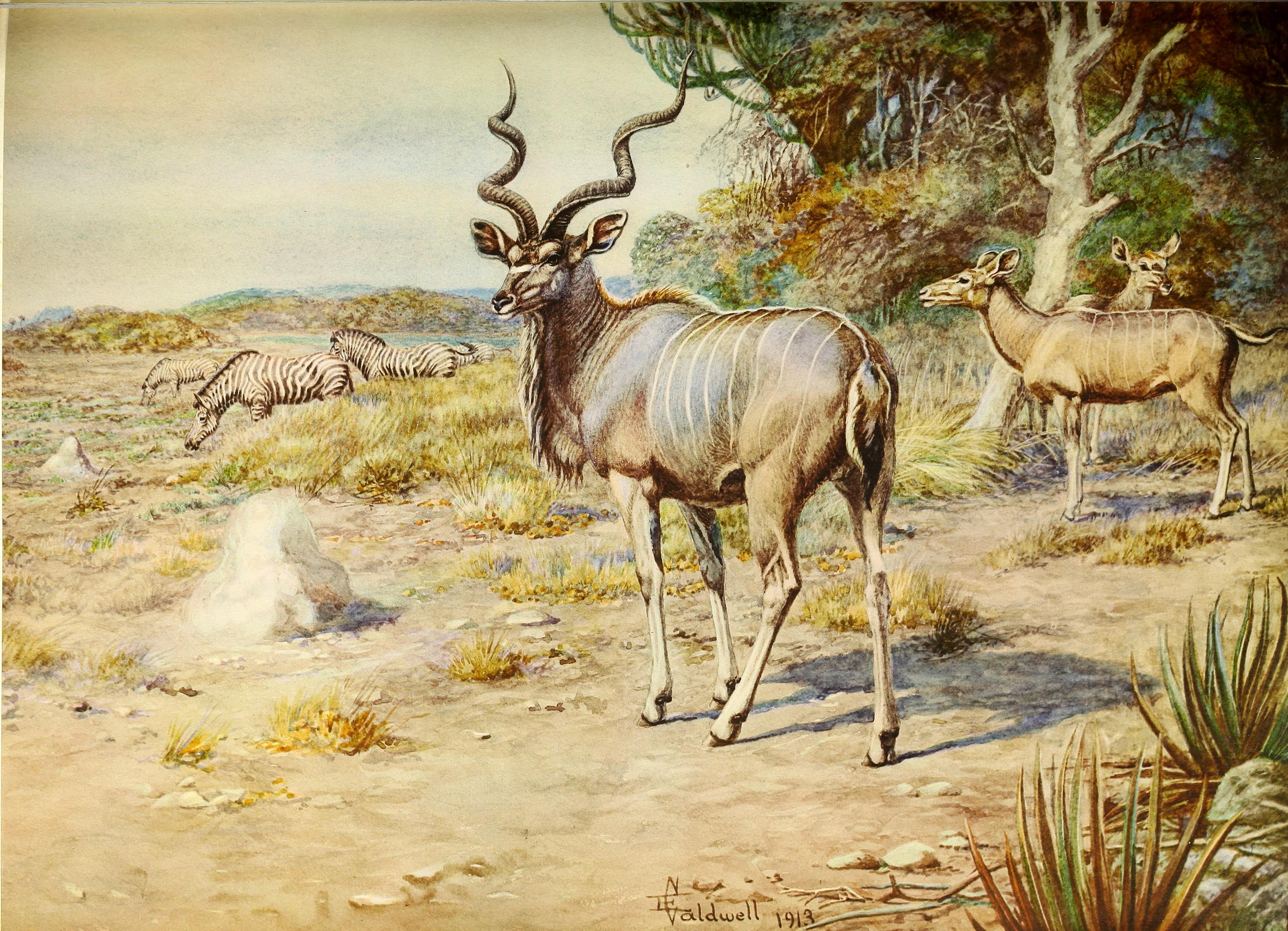

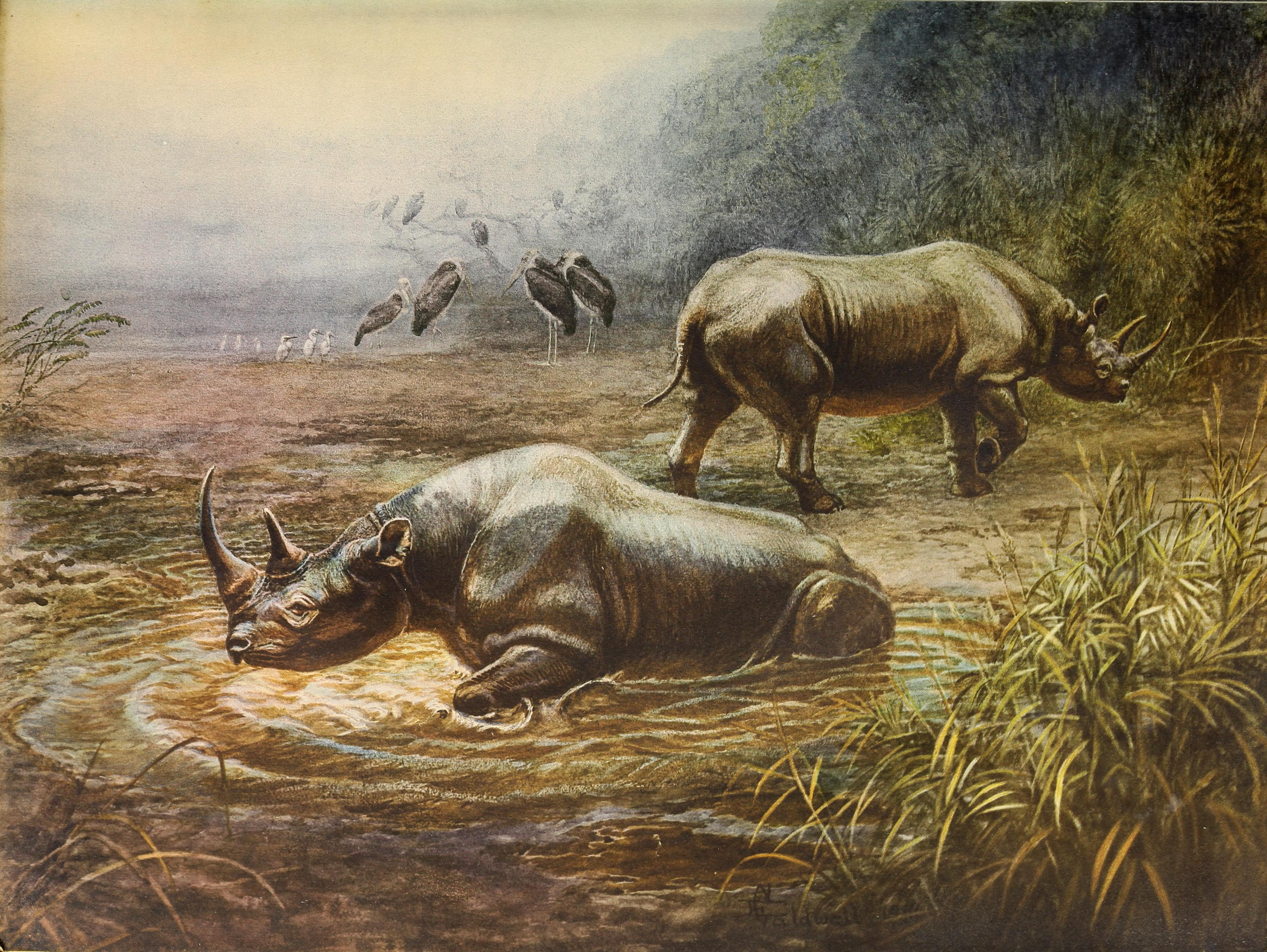

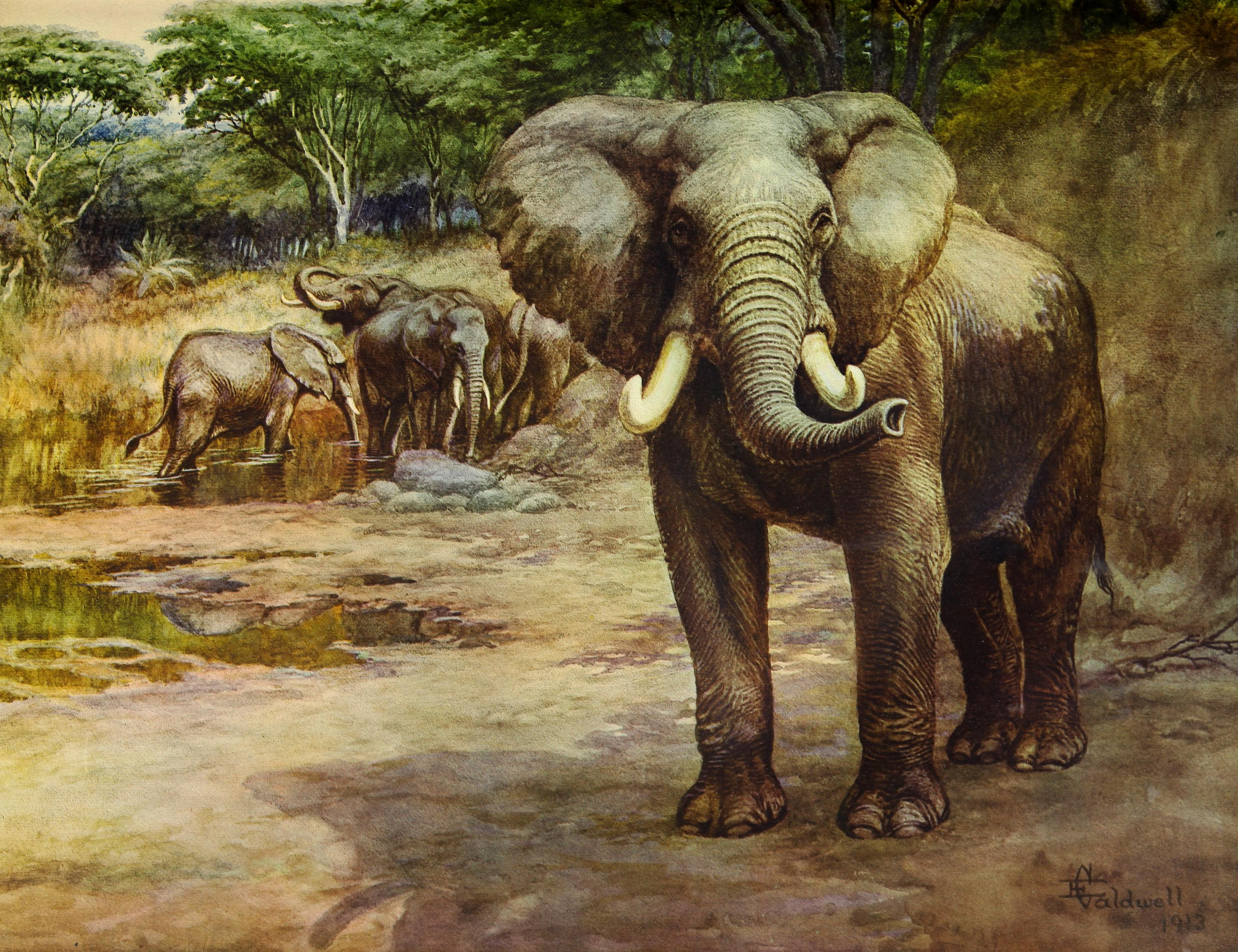
