= Jock the Hero Dog =

- DVD cover
- Directed by: Duncan MacNeillie
- Screenplay by: Duncan MacNeillie; Jim Cox; Robyn Klein
- Based on: Jock of the Bushveld by James Percy FitzPatrick
- Produced by: Duncan MacNeillie
- Starring: Donald Sutherland; Helen Hunt; Ted Danson; Mandy Patinkin; Bryan Adams
- Music by: Klaus Badelt; Ian Honeyman
- Production company: Jock Animation
- Distributed by: ARC Entertainment
- Release date: July 29, 2011
- Running time: 89 minutes
- Country: South Africa
- Language: English

Jock the Hero Dog (also known as Jock of the Bushveld) is a 2011 South African animated adventure comedy film directed by Duncan MacNeillie. It features the voices of Bryan Adams, Donald Sutherland, Helen Hunt, Ted Danson and Mandy Patinkin. It is loosely based on the 1907 book Jock of the Bushveld by Sir James Percy FitzPatrick.

== Voice cast ==
- Bryan Adams as Jock and Sir Percy Fitzpatrick
- Helen Hunt as Jess
- Ted Danson as Pezulu
- Desmond Tutu as Baba
- Mandy Patinkin as Basil
- Sylvaine Strike as Polly
- Anthony Bishop as George
- William Baldwin as Boatman
- Donald Sutherland as Narrator

== Home media ==
This film was released on Blu-ray and DVD in the US in September 25, 2012 by Arc Entertainment.

== Reception ==
Common Sense Media gave the film three stars out of five.
