= Jock of the Bushveld (1986 film) =

1986 South African drama film

- Directed by: Gray Hofmeyr
- Written by: John Cundill
- Based on: Jock of the Bushveld by James Percy FitzPatrick
- Produced by: Duncan MacNeillie
- Starring: Jonathan Rands; Jocelyn Broderick; Michael Brunner; Gordon Mulholland; Wilson Dunster
- Cinematography: Michael Buckley
- Edited by: Valma Muir
- Music by: Keith Hutchinson
- Distributed by: A Duncan MacNeillie Production; Toron International
- Release date: 5 December 1986 (South Africa)
- Running time: 94 min.
- Country: South Africa
- Languages: Afrikaans, English

Jock of the Bushveld is a 1986 South African adventure film directed by Gray Hofmeyr and produced by Duncan MacNeillie for Duncan MacNeillie Production and Toron International. The film stars Jonathan Rands, Jocelyn Broderick and Michael Brunner in lead roles along with Gordon Mulholland, Wilson Dunster in supportive roles and the dog Umfubu.

The film is based on the 1907 novel by same name written by Irish writer James Percy FitzPatrick who went to South Africa in 1800s and experience several incidents in the jungle.

== Plot ==
In 1886, 20-year-old Percy Fitzpatrick from Cape Town sets out for the Delagoa Bay in Transvaal to dig for gold. On his way there he prevents a weakly puppy, Jock, from being drowned and adopts him. When Percy finally reaches his destination, there is no gold anymore, so he starts out as a foreman. Afterwards, he and Jock live through many adventures involving wild animals and slave drivers.

== Cast ==
- Jonathan Rands as Percy Fitzpatrick
- Jocelyn Broderick as Lilian Cubitt
- Michael Brunner as Field Cornet Seedling
- Wilson Dunster as George Barnard
- Umfubu the dog as Jock
- Gordon Mulholland as Tom Barnett
- Marloe Scott Wilson as Maggie Maguire
- Nadine Kadey as Olivia Jones
- Jim Neal as Bill Saunderson
- Fred Baylis as Warthog George
- Oliver Ngwenya as Jim
- Fiona Fraser as Mrs. Cubitt
