= James Percy FitzPatrick =

South African businessman and writer (1862–1931)

Sir Percy FitzPatrick
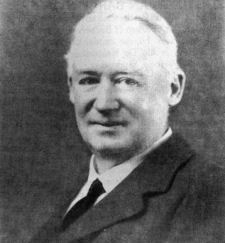
- Sir Percy FitzPatrick
- Born: 24 July 1862; King William's Town, Cape Colony
- Died: 24 January 1931 (aged 68); Amanzi, Uitenhage, Union of South Africa
- Resting place: 33°28′25″S 25°36′20″E
- Occupations: Author, politician, mining financier, farmer
- Writing career
- Language: English
- Period: 1907–1931
- Subject: South Africa
- Notable work: Jock of the Bushveld (1907)

Sir James Percy FitzPatrick, KCMG (24 July 1862 – 24 January 1931), known as Percy FitzPatrick, was a South African author, politician, mining financier and pioneer of the fruit industry. He authored the classic children's book, Jock of the Bushveld (1907). As a politician, he defended British Imperial interests before and during the Anglo-Boer War. FitzPatrick is responsible for the creation of the two-minute silence observed on Armistice Day.

== Early life ==
Percy FitzPatrick was born in King William's Town, the eldest son of James Coleman FitzPatrick, who was a judge of the Supreme Court of the Cape Colony, and Jenny FitzGerald. Both were originally from Ireland. Two of James Coleman FitzPatrick's other sons were killed in action – Thomas in the Matabele Rebellion and George in the Second Anglo-Boer War (serving on the British side with the Imperial Light Horse Regiment).

== Education ==
James Percy FitzPatrick was first educated at Downside School near Bath, Somerset, and later at St. Aidan's College in Grahamstown.

== Career ==
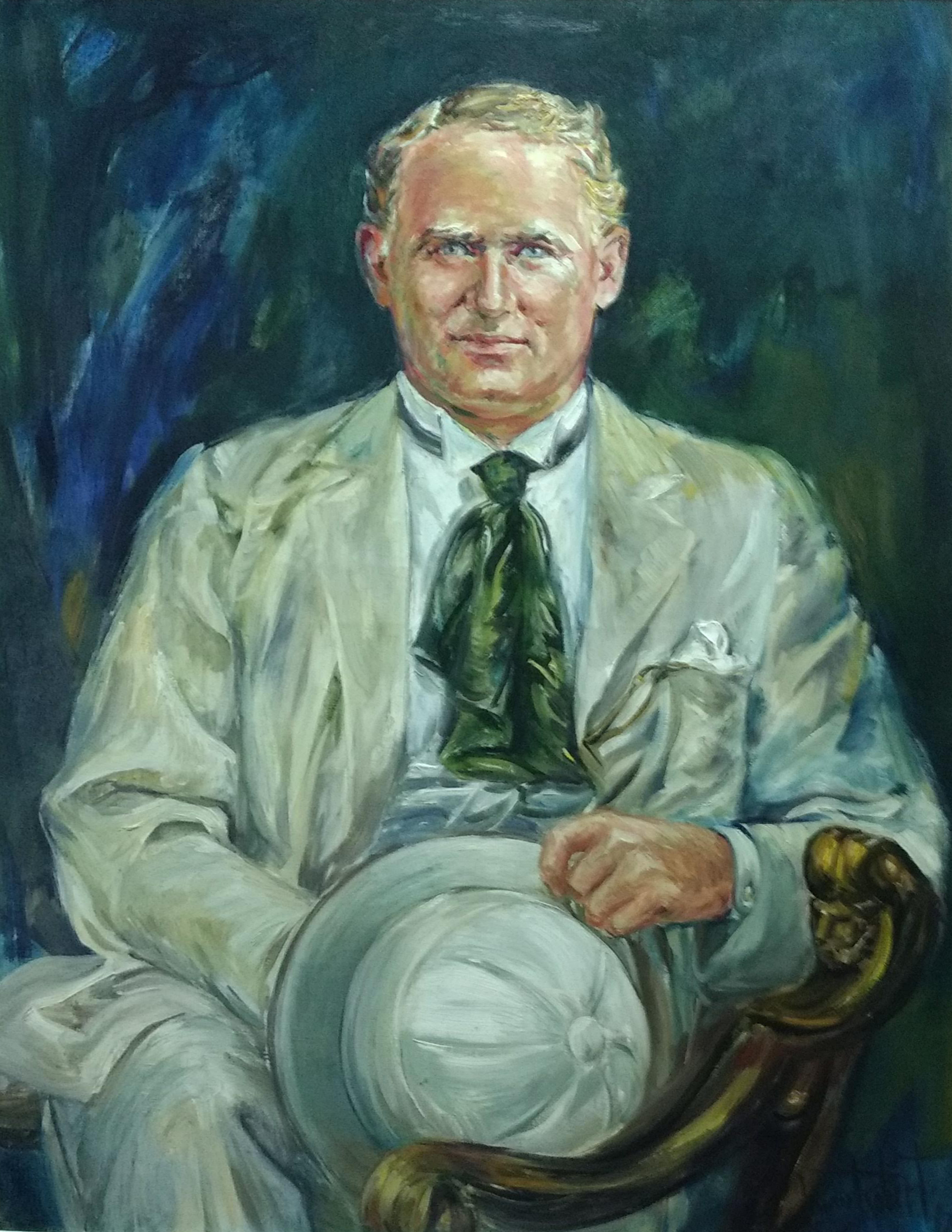
Portrait in the Niven Library at University of Cape Town, SA

After his father's death in 1880, James Peter FitzPatrick (later self-selected Percy) left college to support his mother and her family. After working for some time as a clerk in Cape Town's Standard Bank, he travelled to the Eastern Transvaal goldfields in 1884, where he worked as a storeman, prospector's assistant and journalist as well as an ox-wagon transport-rider from the former Lourenço Marques to Lydenburg and Barberton. He later became editor of the Gold Fields News in Barberton. An account of FitzPatrick's adventures during this time, Jock of the Bushveld, was published in 1907.

He also authored The Transvaal from Within, which greatly influenced public opinion in Great Britain in the years leading up to the Anglo-Boer War. It emphasised the grievances of mainly English-speaking Uitlander against the Boer government and advocated British intervention in the South African Republic (ZAR).

In 1892, FitzPatrick became the head of intelligence in the Johannesburg offices of Hermann Eckstein and Company (part of Wernher-Beit and Company). FitzPatrick became the secretary of the Reform Committee in Johannesburg in 1895. The Committee conspired to overthrow Paul Kruger's South African Republic government from 1895 to 1896. FitzPatrick also acted as go-between the Committee and Cecil Rhodes and Leander Starr Jameson in Cape Town. On 29 December 1895, Jameson led a failed raid from the Bechuanaland Protectorate (modern-day Botswana) to aid the conspirators in Johannesburg, but was stopped at Doornkop on 2 January 1896. FitzPatrick was charged with the others for high treason. Although sentenced to two years' imprisonment and a £2,000 fine, he was released in May 1896.

At the outbreak of the Anglo-Boer War (1899–1902) FitzPatrick helped to establish the Imperial Light Horse Regiment. Prevented by ill health from active service, he remained during the war in Britain as Official Adviser on South African Affairs to the British Government. Percy FitzPatrick was knighted in December 1902, and later appointed a Knight Commander of the Order of Saint Michael and Saint George (KCMG).

He served as one of eight Transvaal representatives in the National Convention of 1908–9, where four British colonies were consolidated into the Union of South Africa. He went on to serve as a member of the parliament of the Union of South Africa, and successfully defended his Pretoria seat in 1906 and 1910. FitzPatrick and General J.B.M. Hertzog worked out the agreement that recognised English and Dutch as the official languages of the Union. He was a vocal supporter of the closed door policy against Indian immigrants. He said that "South Africa was redeemed from barbarism by the white people" and it was "the white people who will have to carry it on, and defend it if needs be".

FitzPatrick kept wild animals that he brought back to Johannesburg after hunting trips at what now is Zoo Lake. Some of these animals formed the first stock of the Johannesburg Zoo. He also helped establish citrus farming in South Africa.

=== Two-minute silence on Armistice Day ===
On 27 October 1919, a suggestion from FitzPatrick for a moment of silence to be observed annually on 11 November, in honour of the dead of World War I, was forwarded to George V, then King of the United Kingdom, who on 7 November 1919, proclaimed "that at the hour when the Armistice came into force, the 11th hour of the 11th day of the 11th month, there may be for the brief space of two minutes a complete suspension of all our normal activities … so that in perfect stillness, the thoughts of everyone may be concentrated on reverent remembrance of the glorious dead." 11 November was the date in 1918 that the formal end of combat occurred to end World War I. FitzPatrick was thanked for his suggestion of the two-minute silence by Lord Stamfordham, the King's Private Secretary:

Dear Sir Percy,
The King, who learns that you are shortly to leave for South Africa, desires me to assure you that he ever gratefully remembers that the idea of the Two Minute Pause on Armistice Day was due to your initiation, a suggestion readily adopted and carried out with heartfelt sympathy throughout the Empire.
Signed Stamfordham

== Family ==
FitzPatrick married Elizabeth Lilian Cubitt (1870-1923) in 1886. They had four children: Percy (1889-1917), Alan (1894-1928), Oliver (1897-1927) and Cecily (1899-1992). Their eldest son, Major Percy Nugent FitzPatrick, was killed on 14 December 1917 in Beaumetz during World War I. The gravestone inscription for Percy highlights his voluntary service at the outbreak of the war (initially with the Johannesburg Light Horse Regiment): "VOLUNTEERED 4 AUGUST 1914 TROOPER, IMPERIAL LIGHT HORSE SOUTH AFRICA". By the time of his death, Percy was serving with the South African Heavy Artillery.

== Death and legacy ==
Sir James Percy FitzPatrick died in Amanzi, Uitenhage, Union of South Africa in 1931, aged 68, from undisclosed causes. He was buried at "The Look Out" 33°28′25″S 25°36′20″E, north of Uitenhage. The site has views of the Sundays River Valley below.

The Percy FitzPatrick Institute of African Ornithology was founded at the University of Cape Town in 1959 by Mrs. Cecily K. Niven, daughter and only surviving child of Percy FitzPatrick, for the study of the living birds of Africa. The Percy FitzPatrick Award is an award for the best South African children's book in English and was initiated in 1970.

== Publications ==
- Through Mashonaland with Pick and Pen (based on Randolph Churchill's 1891 Rhodesian expedition, led by FitzPatrick)
- The Transvaal from Within by J. P. FitzPatrick at Project Gutenberg, 1899
- Jock of the Bushveld (based on FitzPatrick's transport riding days, was first published in 1907 upon persuasion by his friend Rudyard Kipling. The book has so far run through 91 editions and impressions)
- South African Memories (published posthumously)
