= Tubby =

Tubby is a nickname and surname and may refer to:

== People ==
=== Nickname ===
- Tubby Clayton (1885–1972), Anglican clergyman, founder of the Christian movement Toc H
- Michael Lindsay Coulton Crawford (1917–2017), Second World War Royal Navy officer and submariner
- A. A. Englander (1915–2004), British television cinematographer
- D. V. Graves (1886–1960), American college head coach in baseball, football and basketball
- Tubby Hall (1895–1945), American jazz drummer
- Tubby Hayes (1935–1973), English jazz musician
- Tubby Howard (1894–1969), American National Football League player
- Frank W. Lockwood (1890–1954), American college football player
- Tubby Meyers (1887–1940), American college football player and coach
- Tubby Raskin (1902–1981), American basketball player and coach
- Tubby Raymond (1926–2017), American college football and baseball player and College Football Hall of Fame coach
- George Scales (1900–1976), American Negro league baseball player and manager
- Tubby Schmalz (1916–1981), Canadian ice hockey administrator
- Tubby Spencer (1884–1945), American Major League Baseball catcher
- Tubby Smith (born 1951), American college basketball coach
- Mark Taylor (cricketer) (born 1965), Australian batsman and captain

=== Surname ===
- Fred Tubby (born 1947), Australian politician
- Reg Tubby (1924–2015), Australian politician
- Roger Tubby (1910–1991), American government official, reporter and editor, White House Press Secretary from 1952 to 1953
- William Tubby (1858–1944), American architect

=== Other ===
- King Tubby, Jamaican electronics and sound engineer Osbourne Ruddock (1941–1989)

== Fictional characters ==
- Tubby, a dog in the Pup Parade comic strip
- Thomas "Tubby" Tompkins, a boy in the Little Lulu comic strip who had a series of his own from 1952 to 1961
- the title character of:
  - "Tubby the Tuba" (song) (1945)
  - Tubby the Tuba (1947 film), a movie short based on the song
  - Tubby the Tuba (1975 film), an animated movie based on the song

== Animals ==
- Tubby, a dog, the only fatality of the Tacoma Narrows Bridge disaster

== See also ==
- Tubby protein, implicated in obesity
- Teletubbies, a children's television program
