= Tubby the Tuba =

Tubby the Tuba may refer to:

- "Tubby the Tuba" (song), a song by Paul Tripp and George Kleinsinger
- Tubby the Tuba (1947 film), a George Pal Puppetoon movie short based on the song
- Tubby the Tuba (1975 film). an animated film based on the song

== See also ==
- The Manhattan Transfer Meets Tubby the Tuba, an album
