= Jasper Goes Hunting =

1943 film by George Pal

- Directed by: George Pal
- Story by: Jack Miller; George Pal
- Produced by: George Pal
- Starring: Sara Berner; Roy Glenn; Alvin Childress; Lillian Randolph; Mel Blanc (all uncredited)
- Music by: Maurice De Packh
- Animation by: Robert McKimson (Bugs Bunny)
- Color process: Technicolor
- Production company: George Pal Productions
- Distributed by: Paramount Pictures
- Release date: November 19, 1943
- Running time: 7:09
- Country: United States
- Language: English

Jasper Goes Hunting is a 1943 Puppetoons short directed and produced by George Pal and was released on November 19, 1943. The short was distributed by Paramount Pictures. The short features Jasper, his friend/nemesis Professor Scarecrow, and the Blackbird.

== Plot ==
The short begins with Jasper's mother counting her chickens in the chicken coop and realizes that another one has gone missing, and concludes that she's facing a chicken thief. Nearby, said thief, the Scarecrow, is seen finishing his meal.

Jasper is put in charge of guarding the coop as his mother leaves the premises. Armed with a rifle, Jasper fancies himself as a soldier, and starts marching around the house. When the Scarecrow appears at his window, Jasper immediately points his gun at him. The Scarecrow is at first terrified, he explains to Jasper that he should not be pointing the weapon at live targets, since it is likely to go off. Convincing the boy to hand him the rifle, the Scarecrow claims that the "mean-looking" weapon reminds him of his past as a big game hunter.

As the Scarecrow begins narrating his supposed past at the Belgian Congo, the scenery changes into a jungle. The trio are off to a hunting expedition. As the Scarecrow explains that they ate after big game, he fails to notice an African elephant standing behind him. When he does notice, the "brave" hunter flees in terror.

In a 23-second scene, the Scarecrow points his gun at a rabbit hole and orders its resident to come out and fight. Bugs Bunny emerges and says his catchphrase as the Scarecrow recognizes him. Bugs then notices his surrounding and quotes "Hey, I'm in the wrong picture" before waving goodbye and disappearing into the rabbit hole.

A confrontation with an enraged elephant sends the trio flying back towards the hovel. The Scarecrow crashes into the chicken coop and is soon confronted by Jasper's mother, who is also armed and figures that he is the chicken thief.

The final scenes has the Scarecrow and Blackbird in jail with the latter considering writing a letter to the congressman.

== Background ==
The Jasper series of shorts relied on a small, consistent cast. The titular character was a playful pickaninny, his mother a protective mammy, Professor Scarecrow being a black scam artist, and the Blackbird serving as his fast-talking partner-in-crime. Pal described his protagonist as a Huckleberry Finn influenced by African-American folktales. Considering that the righteous boy consistently managed to outwit his plotting enemies, one can see some resemblance to Br'er Rabbit.

The series' use of stereotypes did not seem to attract much criticism at first, but in 1946, Ebony reported "Negro" groups protesting their depiction by Pal. In an apparent response to the criticism, Pal released John Henry and the Inky-Poo (1946), a short based on the folk hero John Henry. Ebony responded favorably at this more serious depiction of a "Negro" protagonist.

Jasper Goes Hunting is notable for including a cameo appearance of Bugs Bunny, courtesy of Leon Schlesinger Productions. Mel Blanc reprises his role as Bugs, while Robert McKimson served as the animator. It marks the first time a Looney Tunes character was publicly used outside of a Warner Bros. related production (if not counting Bugs’ cameos in the Private Snafu shorts for the US Army).

== Sources ==
- Catalog of Copyright Entries. Part 1. [C] Group 3. Dramatic Composition and Motion Pictures. New Series, Library of Congress, United States Copyright Office, 1943–1944
- Cripps, Thomas (1977), Slow Fade to Black: The Negro in American Film, 1900–1942, Oxford University Press, ISBN 978-0-19-987845-1
- Cripps, Thomas (1993), Making Movies Black: The Hollywood Message Movie from World War II to the Civil Rights Era, Oxford University Press, ISBN 978-0-19-536034-9
- Lawson, Tim; Persons, Alisa (2004), "Mel Blanc", The Magic Behind the Voices: A Who's Who of Cartoon Voice Actors, University Press of Mississippi, ISBN 978-1-57806-696-4
- Sampson, Henry T. (1998), That's enough, folks: Black images in animated cartoons, 1900–1960, Scarecrow Press, ISBN 978-0-8108-3250-3
