= Tubby the Tuba (1975 film) =

1975 film by Alexander Schure

- Theatrical release poster
- Directed by: Alexander Schure
- Written by: Paul Tripp and George Kleinsinger
- Produced by: Barry Yellin; Steven Carlin; Alexander Schure
- Starring: Dick Van Dyke; Pearl Bailey; Ruth Enders; Jack Gilford; Hermione Gingold; Ray Middleton; Jane Powell; Cyril Ritchard; David Wayne
- Edited by: Phillip Schopper
- Music by: George Kleisinger
- Production company: New York Institute of Technology
- Distributed by: Avco Embassy Pictures
- Release date: April 1, 1975
- Running time: 81 minutes
- Country: United States
- Language: English

Tubby the Tuba is a 1975 American animated musical-comedy film, based on the 1945 children's story for concert orchestra and narrator by Paul Tripp and George Kleinsinger. It was released on April 1, 1975, by Avco Embassy Pictures. The film was produced by the New York Institute of Technology, under the supervision of its founder, Alexander Schure, who was the project's director.

Nearly three decades before the release of this adaptation, stop-motion innovator George Pal made a 1947 Puppetoon version also based on Tripp and Kleisinger's work, which was nominated for a Best Animated Short Oscar, but lost to Warner Bros. Cartoons' Merrie Melodies short, Tweetie Pie.

== Plot ==
A young tuba named Tubby sets off on a quest to find a song of his own. He visits a circus and ventures into the forest while on the way to Singing City.

== Voice cast ==
- Paul Tripp as Narrator
- Dick Van Dyke as Tubby the Tuba
- David Wayne as Pee-Wee the Piccolo
- Pearl Bailey as Mrs. Elephant
- Jack Gilford as The Herald
- Ray Middleton as The Great Pepperino
- Jane Powell as Celeste
- Cyril Ritchard as The Frog
- Ruth Enders as The Haughty Violin
- Hermione Gingold as Miss Squeek

== Production ==
Tubby the Tuba had his start as the main character in a 1945 children's story for orchestra and narrator, by Paul Tripp and George Kleinsinger, originally performed by Tripp himself, and recorded most famously by Danny Kaye, though many other actor-narrators have performed the piece on record as well, including David Wayne (who also provided a voice for the '71 feature film). The success of the Decca Records track encouraged George Pal, the Puppetoon artist, to make a 1947 short based on it. It would later receive an Oscar nomination for Best Animated Short.

A full-length version of Tubby the Tuba was announced in 1974 by Alexander Schure, the millionaire founder of the New York Institute of Technology. He set up the production at its Westbury, New York facilities, in the Animation Department, Visual Arts Center and Tech Sound Lab of that campus. In order for it to compete with the works of children's film leader Disney, he rounded up a celebrity cast (led by Dick Van Dyke and Pearl Bailey), as well as Tripp, the librettist, and a man known as "the dean of Broadway musical directors", Lehman Engel.

Schure, however, did not know anything about the animation process at the time he started working on it. Because of this, he hired the industry's best artists from the Eastern Seaboard, among whom were Sam Singer from Courageous Cat and Minute Mouse, and John Gentilella from the classic Popeye series.

Schure found the progress on the new Tubby was very slow, hindered by the tedious frame-by-frame process occasionally encountered in the hand-drawn art. In response, he turned to an interest in the young field of computer graphics, and recruited several consultants and scientists from NYIT so that the project could go on. Two of the later crew members were Edwin Catmull and Alvy Ray Smith, the future founders of Pixar Studios.

Thus, it should have marked the first time that computers were ever used in the making of an animated feature, but it ended up being done the conventional way after all. When the film wrapped up production, the first test screenings did not do as well as the crew had hoped it would. As a result, Catmull removed Sam Singer's name from the final prints, taking a credit in Singer's place. He later went on to say about the initial reaction to Tubby:

It was awful, it was terrible, half the audience fell asleep at the screening. We walked out of the room thinking 'Thank God we didn't have anything to do with it, that computers were not used for anything in that movie!'

Of director Schure, Catmull's partner Smith observed: "We realized […] that he really didn't have what it takes to make a movie". Neither of the duo were satisfied with what the finished film had to offer.

== Release ==
In 1974, some time after the end of its production, independent distributor Avco Embassy acquired the rights to release Tubby worldwide. The film came out in select U.S. markets during the following Easter holiday.

The feature-length Tubby has been generally forgotten in the annals of animation history since its original run, but on September 11, 2006, a small label called Pegasus brought out a Region 2 DVD in the United Kingdom. The film has received minor VHS releases in North America, including:

- Children's Video Library (1983)
- Vestron Video (1985)
- Family Home Entertainment (early 1990s)
- Sony Wonder (1995)

In 2012, an unrestored version of Tubby the Tuba was released on DVD in North America by 428 Entertainment.

== See also ==
- Timeline of CGI in film and television
- List of animated feature-length films

== Sources ==
- Beck, Jerry (2005). The Animated Movie Guide. ISBN 1-55652-591-5. Chicago Reader Press. Accessed April 9, 2007.
