= Jasper in a Jam =

- Directed by: Duke Goldstone
- Story by: Bob Larson
- Produced by: George Pal
- Starring: Peggy Lee (vocals); Charlie Barnet (uncredited)
- Music by: Charlie Barnet
- Animation by: G. Warren
- Backgrounds by: Reginald Massie
- Color process: Technicolor
- Production company: Paramount Pictures
- Release date: October 18, 1946
- Country: USA
- Language: English

Jasper in a Jam is a 1946 short film in the Puppetoons series produced and originated by George Pal. It starred the voice of singer Peggy Lee, and was directed by Duke Goldstone and released by Paramount Pictures. It is included in The Puppetoon Movie.

== Plot summary ==
The story takes place in a pawnshop where a young African-American boy named Jasper visits in the city. Every night at midnight, all the musical instruments in the pawnshop come to life and play. The music of Charlie Barnet and his Orchestra are featured playing the songs "Pompton Turnpike" and "Redskin Rhumba" and Lee (as a singing harp) sings "Old Man Mose is Dead". Meanwhile, Jasper after playing a clarinet and jamming with a magic trumpet he is then trapped by a totem pole which plays the saxophone. while being stalked by a clay Indian who throws axes at him. When the night watchman enters the shop, all the items return to their places and Jasper finally makes his escape.
