= George Pal: Man of Tomorrow =

2023 book

- Author: Justin Humphreys
- Language: English
- Genre: Biography, nonfiction
- Publisher: BearManor Media
- Publication date: August 20, 2023
- Publication place: United States
- Media type: Print, ebook
- Pages: 672
- ISBN: 979-8887710426

George Pal: Man of Tomorrow is a 2023 authorized biography written by American film historian Justin Humphreys and published by BearManor Media.

== Overview ==
The authorized biography about the life and work of American science fiction film director George Pal, producer and director of such films as The War of the Worlds, The Time Machine, 7 Faces of Dr. Lao, Destination Moon, Doc Savage: The Man of Bronze and The Wonderful World of the Brothers Grimm.

George Pal: Man of Tomorrow was written with the complete consent of the George Pal Estate.

== Media ==
The book was the winner of Book of the Year at the 22nd Annual Rondo Hatton Awards.

In 2015, George Pal: Man of Tomorrow author, Justin Humphreys, accepted an award on behalf of the late George Pal when Pal was inducted into the New Mexico Museum of Space History International Space Hall of Fame.

== Critical reception ==
Leonard Maltin, "An exhaustive chronicle of a great filmmaker’s journey from Hungary to Hollywood," adding, "You won’t be disappointed, as Humphreys has packed his book with detail upon detail."

Shock Cinema magazine, "This spectacular book is a celebration of a filmmaker who never allowed his fantastical backdrops to overshadow their stories' inherent humanity."
