= Jasper and the Haunted House =

- Directed by: George Pal (uncredited)
- Story by: George Pal
- Produced by: George Pal
- Animation by: Stop-motion artist: Ray Harryhausen (uncredited)
- Color process: Technicolor
- Distributed by: Paramount Pictures
- Release date: October 23, 1942
- Running time: 7 minutes
- Language: English

Jasper and the Haunted House is a 1942 American animated short film in the Madcap Model series by George Pal. It is an early entry that features the popular yet controversial Paramount Puppetoons characters Jasper and his friend/nemesis Professor Scarecrow and Blackbird.

== Plot ==
Full unrestored short

The original Paramount opening titles feature vocals singing the preparation of the pie and the credits displayed as part of the pie's ingredients.

Jasper walks with a gooseberry pie and Professor Scarecrow (aka Mr. Scarecrow) and Blackbird notice the aroma. Both ask Jasper what he is doing with the pie; Jasper says that he is going to deliver it to Deacon Jones as ordered by his mammy. Professor Scarecrow opens Jasper's pie (by unzipping and zipping the crust) and finds out it is gooseberry. Jasper walks away, irritated by Professor Scarecrow and Blackbird's curiosity. Professor Scarecrow switches a nearby sign (one pointing to the Deacon's home and the other pointing to a haunted house) to trick Jasper so he can get his hands on Jasper's pie. Jasper comes back, then Professor Scarecrow and Blackbird lie about the sign. Jasper doesn't believe him at first and says "There ain't nothin' down that way but a ha-haunted house". Professor Scarecrow and Blackbird lie again and say that the house is no longer haunted as the "haunts" were drafted for World War II. Jasper is now convinced, so he thanks Professor Scarecrow for showing him the right way; however, Professor Scarecrow and Blackbird laugh once Jasper has left.

The next scene begins as Jasper arrives at the (obviously) haunted house. He enters and yells for the Deacon, but instead the door slams shut and locks behind him. Trapped and frightened, Jasper walks forward into the room (with a gag where his shadow walks back), and Professor Scarecrow and Blackbird scare Jasper into leaving the pie on a table by the staircase; Jasper then hides in an old piano. It seems as if the plan worked, but when Professor Scarecrow gets in an argument with Blackbird about sharing the pie, the pie itself is taken by a ghost. Professor Scarecrow then accuses Blackbird of taking the pie, but the argument ends when they find that it was a ghost who took it. Frightened, Professor Scarecrow and Blackbird hide in the piano with Jasper after the pie is eaten and the invisible ghost tosses back the pan ("There ya' are, boys. Get you a refund on the tin.") The ghost walks across to the piano and gets ready to play it. ("Nothin' like a little music after dinner", says the ghost.) The three characters whisper that they cannot see him, and there's a swing boogie-woogie piece played (possibly influenced by Thanks for the Boogie Ride) and every inanimate object begins to dance, from the grandfather clock to the bookshelf to the pie pan. Meanwhile, the piano keys hit the main characters as the music plays. The ghost's vigorous playing sends the trio out of the piano, out through the roof of the haunted house, and they hit a billboard.

Jasper, afraid he will get in trouble, asks "What am I gonna tell my mammy about that pie?" Professor Scarecrow gives Jasper the empty pie pan as a way to prove that the pie was delivered. Jasper, furious, begins hitting the pie pan on their heads. The camera zooms out with a controversial advertisement for a fake brand of pie that says "Next Time Try Spook's Gooseberry Pie". Jasper drops the pan onto the ground revealing the Paramount Pictures print logo of the time on it.

== Later releases ==
Jasper and the Haunted House has not been seen on TV for many years because it was deemed racist. It was retitled by U.M. & M. TV Corporation and the Paramount pie pan was cut out and was replaced by the same "The End" title used in Little Lulu films. The only official video releases were on The Puppetoon Movie DVD released by Image Entertainment, and again later the Blu-ray of the same film.

The film has also fallen into the public domain as NTA failed to renew the copyrights on the film, except possibly underlying music rights issues with Famous Music, as well as the eventual Arnold Leibovit's later trademarking of Puppetoons.

Because of this, Jasper and the Haunted House found its way to numerous public domain video collections.
