= Philips Cavalcade =

- Directed by: George Pal
- Story by: George Pal
- Animation by: Stop-motion artist: George Pal
- Color process: Technicolor
- Release date: February 2, 1934
- Running time: 6 minutes
- Country: Netherlands
- Language: English

Philips Cavalcade is a 1934 animated short film in the Puppetoon series. It was directed by George Pal.

The short was a theatrical advertisement for Philips and was also included in the 1987 compilation film The Puppetoon Movie.

== Plot ==
In the short, people start singing and a woman Philippa Ray sings a song on the microphone. There are people dancing in playing instruments. On the stage four men are singing. One sings soprano and one sings bass. Suddenly one person plays the trumpet and other people start singing. They start dancing at the end.
