= The Puppetoon Movie =

- Theatrical release poster
- Directed by: Arnold Leibovit
- Written by: Arnold Leibovit
- Produced by: Arnold Leibovit
- Starring: Dick Beals; Art Clokey; Paul Frees; Dallas McKennon
- Music by: Buddy Baker
- Production companies: Arnold Leibovit Entertainment; Paramount Pictures (original segments; uncredited)
- Distributed by: Expanded Entertainment
- Release date: June 12, 1987
- Running time: 79 minutes
- Country: United States
- Language: English

The Puppetoon Movie is a 1987 fantasy comedy animated film written, produced, and directed by Arnold Leibovit. It is based on the Puppetoons characters created by George Pal in the 1930s and 1940s which feature the eponymous Puppetoon animation, and features Gumby, Pokey and Arnie the Dinosaur, who host the framing story. Its framing story stars the voices of Dick Beals, Art Clokey, Paul Frees and Dallas McKennon as the main characters.

The original 1987 release of The Puppetoon Movie contained 11 Puppetoons. The 2000 DVD release included 9 additional Puppetoons and the 2013 Blu-ray release added 7 more.

In 2020, The Puppetoon Movie Volume 2 was released on Blu-ray and DVD, featuring 17 shorts not included on any of the Puppetoon Movie releases and The Ship of the Ether.

In 2023, The Puppetoon Movie Volume 3 was released on Blu-ray, featuring 28 shorts, including 7 previously released on The Puppetoon Movie with higher resolution and vastly improved restorations.

The film was dedicated to Paul Frees.

== Plot ==
On a film set, Gumby and his friends are shooting a dinosaur movie. However, the Tyrannosaurus rex, Arnie, is reluctant to act ferocious. Upon questioning, Arnie feels unfit for the part, and explains that he once was ferocious, but thanks to the influence of George Pal, he has reformed. Gumby fails to understand the profound effect of Pal, so Arnie and Pokey show Gumby a set of Pal shorts to show him the significance of the artist.

Pal short films featured:

- The Little Broadcast
- Philips Broadcast of 1938
- Hoola Boola
- South Sea Sweethearts
- The Sleeping Beauty
- Tulips Shall Grow
- Together in the Weather
- John Henry and the Inky-Poo
- Philips Cavalcade
- Jasper in a Jam
- Tubby the Tuba

Afterwards, Gumby and the crew meet other characters who Pal animated, such as the Pillsbury Doughboy and the Alka-Seltzer mascot Speedy as well as the titular monkey of the Curious George books and the titular amphibians of the Frog and Toad books. Gumby thanks Pal for making all this possible. The screen pans out and shows a gremlin, who looks at the audience, says "George Pal!" in a raspy voice, then ascends a support beam while laughing hysterically.

== Voices ==
- Dick Beals
- Art Clokey
- Paul Frees
- Dallas McKennon

== Home video ==
In addition to the film shorts listed above, the following Pal film shorts are also included in the 2000 DVD edition from Image Entertainment and the 2013 Blu-ray edition from B2MP: What Ho She Bumps, Mr. Strauss Takes a Walk, Olio for Jasper, Jasper's Derby, Ether Symphony, Aladdin and the Magic Lamp, The Magic Atlas, Jasper and the Haunted House, and The Ship of the Ether.

The 2013 Blu-ray also includes the following short films previously unavailable on home video (all sublicensed by Puppetoons' original distributor Paramount): The Oscar-nominated And to Think That I Saw It on Mulberry Street, The 500 Hats of Bartholomew Cubbins, Sky Princess, Rhapsody in Wood, Date with Duke, Jasper and the Beanstalk, and Rhythm in the Ranks. In addition, the Blu-ray also includes The Great Rupert which was produced by George Pal and the documentary The Fantasy Film Worlds of George Pal.

A DVD edition from B2MP was released in 2013.

On March 24th, 2026, a Director's Cut was released on Blu-ray. This edition features a 4K transfer from the original camera negative, restores the original Paramount logos, titles and copyrights to the cartoons seen in the film originally distributed by said studio and includes an additional Puppetoon; Wilbur the Lion. The release also includes a new retrospective documentary, a restored edition of George Pal's Horlicks short What Ho She Bumps plus additional commercial shorts.

== Reception ==
The film received mixed to positive reviews.

== Awards ==
George Pal's Puppetoon body of work was recognized by a Special Oscar at the 16th Academy Awards in 1944. Pal received the Special Oscar "for the development of novel methods and techniques in the production of short subjects known as Puppetoons".
