= Kay Lande =

American composer and singer

- Also known as: Kathryn Lande Selmer Brown
- Born: November 6, 1930; Westerleigh, Staten Island, New York, US
- Died: November 20, 2022 (aged 92)
- Genres: Children's
- Occupations: Composer, musician
- Instrument: Singing
- Labels: A. A.; Caprice; Children's Records of America; Columbia; Disneyland; Educational Reading Service; Golden Press; Golden; Harmony; Kaneil; Leo the Lion; RCA Camden; Simon Says; Wonder; Wonderland
- Publisher: Wellington Songs
- Spouse: Edward Selmer Jr. (m. 1953; died 2000) William Brown (m. 2010)

Kathryn Lande Selmer Brown (November 6, 1930 – November 20, 2022) was an American composer and singer who was best known for her compositions and performances for children, which include three operas, many songs, and appearances on television, including as co-host of the television show Birthday House. She performed and published her music under the name Kay Lande.

== Biography ==
Lande was born in Westerleigh, Staten Island, New York. She studied music at the Eastman and the Juilliard Schools of Music. In 1953, she married Edward Selmer Jr. and they had a son and a daughter. After Selmer's death in 2000, she married William Brown.

== Career ==
A member of the American Society of Composers, Authors, and Publishers (ASCAP), Lande was employed by CBS. She collaborated as a singer and composer with many musicians, including Edna Bettler, the Carillon Singers, Eric Carlson, Art Carney, Alan Cole, Wade Denning, Carol Joan Drexler, Jim Dukas, Kathy Dunn, Tom Glazer, the Golden Orchestra, Carolyn Jonathan, Danny Kaye, Gene Kelly, Andre Kostelanetz, Jack Lazare, Anne Lloyd, the Norman Luboff Choir, Gilbert Mack, Mitch Miller and his orchestra, Hunter Payne, Edgar Powell, Peggy Powers, Noel Regney and his orchestra, Harold Ronk, the Sandpipers Chorus and Orchestra (also known as the Golden Sandpipers), Bob Spiro, Frank Stanton, Gene Steck, Jim Timmens and the Golden Orchestra, and Paul Tripp.

Lande was recorded commercially by A. A. Records, Caprice, Children's Records of America, Columbia, Disneyland, Educational Reading Service, Golden Press, Golden Records, Harmony, Kaneil Music, Leo the Lion Records, RCA Camden, Simon Says, Wonder, and Wonderland Records. She appeared on the following television programs:

- Arthur Murray Party (1952)
- Birthday House (late 1950s – early 1960s)
- Diver Dan and the Bermuda Onion (1961)
- Captain Kangaroo (1962)
- Romper Room (undated)

== Compositions ==
Lande's music was published by Wellington Songs. Her compositions include:

=== Incidental music ===
- Birthday House
- Captain Kangaroo

=== Operas ===
- The Princess and the Pea
- The Princess Who Couldn't Laugh
- The Shoemaker and the Elf

=== Songs ===
- Bubbly Time (with Wade Denning)
- Father, I Thank Thee (with Edna Bettler)
- For Sleepyheads Only
- I Know a Game (with Wade Denning)
- Kay Lande's ABC 123
- Kitty Kat
- Let's Go to the Toy Shop
- Let's Have a Party
- Let's Play School
- Mommy, Come See
- Mommy, Please Come Play with Me
- My Little Ballerina
- My Musical Monkey (with Frank Stanton)
- Song for Little Folk
- Tennis? Tennis?
- Trip to Lullaby Land (with Edna Bettler)
