= The Christmas That Almost Wasn't =

1966 film by Rossano Brazzi

- U.S. theatrical release poster
- Directed by: Rossano Brazzi
- Written by: Paul Tripp
- Produced by: Barry B. Yellen
- Starring: Rossano Brazzi; Paul Tripp
- Cinematography: Alvaro Mancori
- Edited by: Maurizio Lucidi
- Music by: Songs: Paul Tripp; Ray Carter; Score: Bruno Nicolai
- Production company: Bambi Film; Childhood Productions
- Distributed by: Medusa Film (Italy); Childhood Productions (U.S.)
- Release dates: September 5, 1966 (Venice); November 23, 1966 (U.S.)
- Running time: 93 minutes (Italy); 89 minutes (U.S.)
- Country: Italy; United States
- Language: English

The Christmas That Almost Wasn't (Italian: Il Natale che quasi non fu) is a 1966 Christmas musical fantasy film directed by Rossano Brazzi in his feature directorial debut and written by Paul Tripp, who also star in the leading roles. The cast also features Alberto Rabagliati, Mischa Auer, and Sonny Fox. The film offers a whimsical account of the origins of department store Santa Clauses.

== Plot ==
Sam Whipple, a broke lawyer who is nevertheless young at heart, meets Santa Claus and learns that he is upset because he has a new landlord named Phineas T. Prune, to whom Santa owes a great deal of rent. Prune has threatened to confiscate Santa's toys and have him, Mrs. Claus and the elves evicted. In order to raise money, Sam and Santa get jobs at a department store, where working for two days will somehow earn enough money to pay all of the rent that is due. Santa is nervous at first, but when the children arrive, they naturally gravitate to him and he becomes a big success.

Prune schemes to thwart Sam and Santa's plans. He buys the department store, has his butler destroy several of the toys and takes the damages out of Santa and Sam's paychecks. He gloats that Santa will never be able to pay his rent on time.

Now broke again, Sam and Santa fear Christmas will be canceled. A little boy passes them on the street and asks them what is the matter. When Sam explains, the little boy calls out to the city's children to help Santa. All of the children pour into the streets and give what money they can, more than enough to pay all of the rent that is due.

Santa pays Prune his rent at the last minute. Then Santa, Mrs. Claus and Sam deliver the gifts together. They are surprised to discover that the very last gift is addressed to none other than Prune.

They arrive at Prune's home and Santa offers him the gift. He opens it and is moved to find that it is the toy sailboat that he had wanted as a boy. A letter from Santa's head elf apologizes for the clerical error that resulted in Santa never visiting him as a child. Prune rediscovers his holiday spirit and runs into the street wishing everyone a merry Christmas, bewildering the townsfolk with his enthusiasm. As Santa and Mrs. Claus depart, he thanks Sam for all his help.

Prune generously gives his sailboat to a little boy as the town's children look on with delight. He invites all of them to his mansion for a Christmas party.

== Cast ==
- Rossano Brazzi as Phineas T. Prune
- Paul Tripp as Sam Whipple
- Alberto Rabagliati as Santa Claus
- Lydia Brazzi as Mrs. Santa Claus
- Mischa Auer as Jonathan, the elf foreman
- Sonny Fox as Mr. Prim
- John Karlsen as Blossom
- David Tripp as David
- John Spencer Howell Jr. as Little boy
- Michel Yellen as Little girl
- Valentino Macchi as an elf

== Production ==
The film was an Italian and American co-production, shot primarily in Rome at Cinecittà Studios. The animated title sequence was designed by Emanuele Luzzati.

The songs in the film were written by Paul Tripp and Ray Carter, with an underscore by Bruno Nicolai. The title song was sung by Glenn Yarbrough.

== Release ==
The film premiered out-of-competition at the 27th Venice International Film Festival. It had its American premiere at the Stern's department store in New York City.

=== Home media ===
The film was released on DVD on October 7, 2003, to Region 1. It is the unedited 93-minute version.

=== Television ===
On television, the movie had traditional December airings on Home Box Office (HBO) during the 1970s and early 1980s.

=== Streaming ===
The Christmas That Almost Wasn't was made available for streaming through Netflix, Amazon Video, and Peacock.

== References in other media ==
In The Simpsons episode "Skinner's Sense of Snow" (2000), Principal Seymour Skinner shows a film called The Christmas That Almost Wasn't, But Then Was.

The film was riffed in 2017 on the 11th season of Mystery Science Theater 3000.

== See also ==
- List of Christmas films
- Santa Claus in film
