= Melissa Holbrook Pierson =

American writer (born 1957)

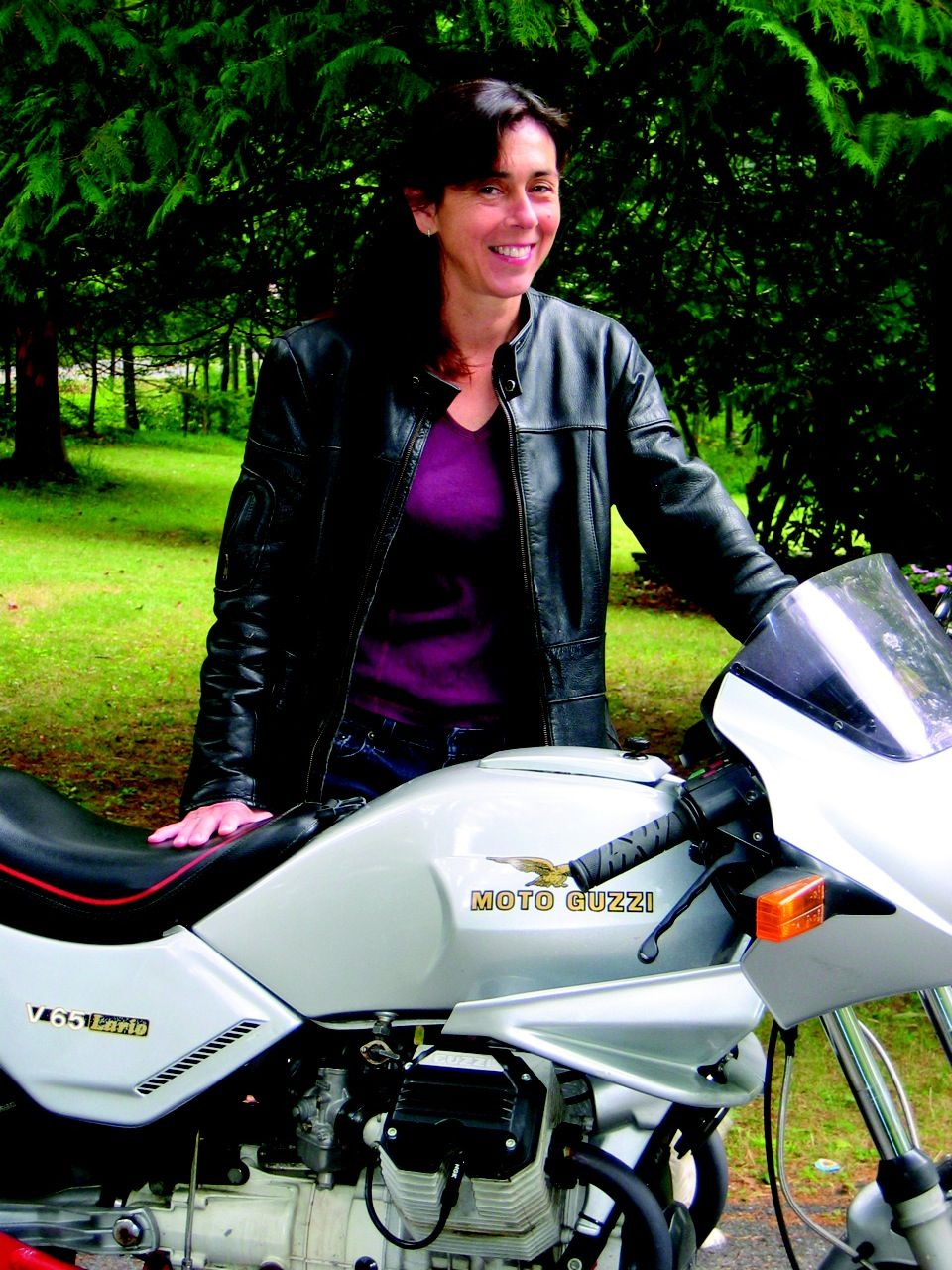
- Born: December 14, 1957 (age 68); Akron, Ohio
- Citizenship: American
- Education: A.B. Vassar College 1980; M.A. Columbia University 1984
- Occupation: Writer
- Writing career
- Notable work: The Perfect Vehicle: What It Is About Motorcycles
- Website: www.melissaholbrookpierson.com

Melissa Holbrook Pierson (born December 14, 1957) is an American writer and essayist of non-fiction.

== Early life and education ==
Pierson was born in Akron, Ohio. She attended Vassar College, receiving her AB in English Literature in 1980. Her MA, also in English Literature, was awarded in 1984 by Columbia University.

== Biography ==
She is a lifelong motorcycle enthusiast and this is reflected in many of her books. Her works are often explorations of personal experience, extended into general social commentary and history. She is a longtime book, film, and photography critic, and reviewed film on video for Entertainment Weekly, 1990–1999.

When asked in an interview, "Do you consider yourself a travel writer, a kind of 'place writer', a nature writer, or—" Pierson answered, "All of those things. I don't think of myself as fitting into a category. But I had to be careful in all of my books not to repeat things, because I have these ideas, and though the subjects were disparate, the same idea would come up through different portals."

The Place You Love is Gone was described by Anthony Swofford in The New York Times Book Review as "the punk rock girl sitting in the rear pews at church, offering a counter narrative: what she says about the patriarchy and the raping of the land (and the Indians and dairy farmers and denizens of small towns in upstate New York) is true but the priests (elected politicians and water managers and ambitious city planners) wish her parents would drag the girl home; the organ player pipes louder in order to drown the punk's anti-establishment rant."

== Publications ==
=== Books ===
- The Perfect Vehicle: What It Is About Motorcycles (First ed.), W. W. Norton & Company, 1997, ISBN 978-0-393-04064-7
- El Vehiculo Perfecto (1st ed.), La Mala Suerte Ediciones, 2020, ISBN 978-84-121436-1-4
- Dark Horses and Black Beauties: Animals, Women, a Passion, W. W. Norton & Company, 2000, ISBN 0-393-04947-7
- Lucy, Sante; Pierson, Melissa Holbrook, eds. (2000), O.K. You Mugs, Granta Books, ISBN 1-86207-362-7
- The Place You Love is Gone: Progress Hits Home, W. W. Norton & Company, 2006, ISBN 0-393-05739-9
- The Man Who Would Stop at Nothing, W. W. Norton & Company, 2011, ISBN 978-0-393-07904-3
- The Secret History of Kindness: Learning From How Dogs Learn, W. W. Norton & Company, 2015, ISBN 978-0-393-06619-7

=== Essays ===
- "Memory City", published in Place (2020 - 2021)
- "Air and Ice, 1994", published in Tin House (May 9, 2018)
- "Losing Home", published in Orion Magazine
- “Guided by the Stars", published in Moto Guzzi: 100 Years, ed. Jeffrey Schnapp (Rizzoli, 2021)
- “My Fifteen Minutes", published in Howl: A Collection of the Best Contemporary Dog Wit (Crown, 2007), “Bark” Editors
- “Whippets", published in Taking Things Seriously (Princeton Architectural Press, 2007), eds. Joshua Glenn & Carol Hayes
- Sante, Luc; Pierson, Melissa Holbrook (April 2003), "The Deja-vu Vacation", Conde Nast Traveler, vol. 38, no. 4, p. 140(9)
- “The Hunted", published in All the Available Light (Simon & Schuster, 2002), ed. Yona Zeldis McDonough
- "Summit Mall.(Short Story)", TriQuarterly, no. 106, p. 65, Fall 1999
- “To the Edge: Motorcycles and Danger", published in The Art of the Motorcycle (Guggenheim Museum, 1998)
- Sante, Luc; Pierson, Melissa Holbrook (January 1996), "The Call of the Wild (Western US)", Conde Nast Traveler, vol. 31, no. 1, p. 80(13)
- "Precious Dangers: The Lessons of the Motorcycle", Harper's Magazine, vol. 290, no. 1740, p. 69, May 1995
