= The Singing Bone =

German fairy tale

Folk tale
- Name: The Singing Bone
- Aarne–Thompson grouping: ATU 780
- Country: Germany
- Published in: Grimms' Fairy Tales

"The Singing Bone" (German: Der singende Knochen) is a German fairy tale, collected by the Brothers Grimm, tale number 28. It is Aarne-Thompson type 780.

== Synopsis ==
A boar lays waste to a country, and two brothers set out to kill it, with the prize being given the princess's hand in marriage. The younger meets a dwarf who gives him a spear, and with it, he kills the boar. Carrying the body off, the man meets his older brother, who had joined with others to drink until he felt brave. The older brother lures him in, gives him drink, and learns of the younger brother's adventure. They then set out to deliver the body to the king, but on passing a bridge, the older kills the younger and buries his body beneath it. He takes the boar himself to the king and marries the king's daughter as prize.

One day a shepherd sees a bone under the bridge and uses it to make a mouthpiece for a horn, which sings of the brother's fate:

Ah! Dear shepherd, you are blowing your horn
With one of my bones, which night and morn
Lie still unburied, beneath the wave
Where I was thrown in a sandy grave.
I killed the wild boar, and my brother slew me,
And gained the princess by pretending 'twas he.

The shepherd takes this marvel to the king, who has the bridge examined, and the bones of the deceased brother are found. The older brother is not able to deny his actions, and is drowned as punishment. The younger brother's bones are reburied in a beautiful grave.

== Origin ==
Graham Anderson has identified the ancient Greek story of Meleager and the Calydonian boar as a possible early variant of this story, noting that both stories involve a man who hunts a boar, murders a relative, and is killed when this information is found out. Also, in both stories, the murderer's doom is brought about by "a hidden, stick-like object of whose effect the criminal himself can have no knowledge".

== Variations and adaptations ==
In music

- The cantata Das Klagende Lied by the Austrian composer Gustav Mahler is based partly upon this tale.
- The song Beneath the Wave by the UK band Violet Underground is based upon this tale and uses the horn song entirely as the chorus.
- This tale is also found in ballad form in "The Twa Sisters" (alternatively, "Cruel Sister"), wherein the siblings are sisters instead of brothers.
  - In a Norwegian variant, "Harpa".
  - In a Danish variant, "Der boede en Mand ved Sønderbro".

In literature

- Beth Hahn's literary suspense novel, The Singing Bone (2016), is loosely based on "The Twa Sisters".

In film

- The story is adapted in the film The Wonderful World of the Brothers Grimm, where the boar is replaced with a dragon and the brothers are replaced by a knight and his squire. The squire is miraculously revived at the end of the tale, and the knight is not executed but instead must become the now knighted squire's servant as punishment.
