= LIFE. Hollywood =

2024 photo book collection

- Author: Lucy Sante; Justin Humphreys
- Language: English
- Subject: Show business, Hollywood, movie stars
- Genre: Photo book, coffee table book
- Publisher: Taschen
- Publication date: 2024
- Publication place: United States
- Media type: Print

LIFE. Hollywood is a two-volume 2024 show business and Hollywood themed photo book collection of photos from Life magazine.

It was published by Taschen and features captions by film historian Justin Humphreys, introductory texts by photography critic Lucy Sante and photography of over 70 Life photographers capturing Hollywood's Golden Age from 1936 to 1972.

LIFE. Hollywood was featured in The New York Times 2024 Holiday Gift Guide and on the 2024 list of 17 Best Books for Angelenos in the Los Angeles Times.

== Critical reception ==
The Hollywood Reporter, "Taschen’s new must-have book."

The New York Times, "Once you get past the images you’ve seen time and again (James Dean walking through a rainy Times Square, a trio of darkly dressed Italian women looking askance at a scandal-ridden Ingrid Bergman), this massive two-volume set offers a mix of striking celebrity portraiture and behind-the-scenes reportage."

Variety, "The 600-page set features a treasure trove of images from Life’s extensive archives, along with essays by Justin Humphreys to provide vital context about each subject and the circumstances under which he, she or it was chronicled in its pages.

The Wall Street Journal, "Life magazine’s photojournalists didn’t merely seek glamorous shots of movie stars. They wanted to depict them on set, revealing for readers how movies get made."

== See also ==
Life magazine
