= I Heard Her Call My Name: A Memoir of Transition =

2024 memoir by Lucy Sante

- Author: Lucy Sante
- Language: English
- Genre: Memoir
- Publisher: Penguin Random House
- Publication date: 2024
- Publication place: United States
- ISBN: 9780593493779
- OCLC: 1381887700
- Dewey Decimal: 306.76/80092 B
- LC Class: HQ77.8.S353 A3 2024

I Heard Her Call My Name: A Memoir of Transition is a 2024 memoir written by Lucy Sante. The memoir follows Sante's process of gender transition and coming out as a trans woman at age 67.

This is Sante's second memoir, following The Factory of Facts: A Memoir which was published in 1999.

== Reception ==
I Heard Her Call My Name received a starred review from Publishers Weekly and was also positively reviewed by The Washington Post. The New York Times included it on its list of the Ten Best Books of 2024. It was a finalist for the 2025 Pulitzer Prize in Memoir or Autobiography.
