= Tubby the Tuba (song) =

Single by Victor Jory, Léon Barzin Orchestra
- Released: November 1945
- Genre: children's
- Length: 14:00
- Label: Cosmo Records
- Composer: George Kleinsinger
- Lyricist: Paul Tripp

"Tubby the Tuba" is a 1945 song with lyrics written by Paul Tripp and music composed by George Kleinsinger. The original 1946 recording featured Victor Jory's narration. A second recording, released on the Decca label in 1947, was played by Hollywood Musician Tuba Soloist, George F. Boujie and was narrated and sung by Danny Kaye and later featured on his Hans Christian Andersen album, along with the sequel, Tubby the Tuba at the Circus.

== History ==
The song traces its origins back to World War II, following the attack on Pearl Harbor. After Tripp and Kleinsinger performed their first musical piece, the tuba player quipped: "You know, tubas can sing, too". With this in mind, Tripp wrote the tale of a tuba who found a melody to play, and the pair then made a song out of it.It was not until the war ended that they finally had a hit with "Tubby". There have been spin-offs involving two other characters from the song, Peepo the Piccolo and Celeste. The Manhattan Transfer recorded an album featuring the character, their only one for children, in 1994; it contained the three sequel songs called "The Further Adventures of Tubby the Tuba", "Tubby the Tuba Joins the Circus", and "Tubby the Tuba Meets a Jazz Band".

Other versions of "Tubby the Tuba" include a 1958 version narrated by José Ferrer that was nominated for the Best Recording For Children at the 1st Annual Grammy Awards; a version featuring Mouseketeer Annette Funicello as the narrator; a version featuring Julia Child with changes in the story, under the direction of Arthur Fiedler and the Boston Pops Orchestra in 1971; and the 1996 release on Angel/EMI Records called Tubby the Tuba and Friends. The orchestral tracks "Tubby the Tuba", "The Story of Celeste", "Adventures of a Zoo", and "Peepo the Piccolo", were recorded by the Radio Orchestra of Bratislava under the baton of Stephen Gunzenhauser. A final track, "Tubby the Tuba Meets a Jazz Band", was recorded in New York City with Bob Stewart on tuba, Jimmy Owens on trumpet, Paquito D'Rivera on clarinet, Marco Katz on trombone, Chuck Folds on piano, John Thomas on percussion, and Oliver Jackson on drums. Paul Tripp is the narrator on this recording.

Several of the same instrumental tracks appear on a 2006 release called Play it Happy on Koch Records that features Meredith Vieira on "Tubby the Tuba" and "Tubby the Tuba Meets a Jazz Band" and Paul Tripp on "The Story of Celeste".

"Tubby the Tuba" has been translated into over 30 languages, and has been narrated by Today host Meredith Vieira. Tripp's original story was printed by E. P. Dutton in 2006, in commemoration of its 60th anniversary (ISBN 0-525-47717-9). The original 1946 recording was added to the National Recording Registry in 2005.

== In other Media ==
George Pal to make a 1947 Puppetoon based on it, which was nominated for a Best Animated Short Oscar.

It was followed by a 1975 animated feature, which was the first of its kind to take advantage of computer technology.

A ballet by Ron Cunningham was created and produced by the Boston Ballet in 1974.

== Sources ==
- Beck, Jerry (2005). The Animated Movie Guide. ISBN 1-55652-591-5. Chicago Reader Press. Accessed April 9, 2007.
