= Justin Humphreys =

- Born: United States
- Education: University of Virginia
- Occupations: Film historian, writer, author, curator
- Notable work: LIFE. Hollywood

Justin Humphreys is an American film historian, writer, author and curator. Humphreys is the author and co-author of such books as Names You Never Remember, With Faces You Never Forget, the authorized biography of film director George Pal, George Pal: Man of Tomorrow, the Vincent Price themed The Dr. Phibes Companion and the photo book LIFE. Hollywood which was featured on the 2024 list of 17 Best Books for Angelenos in the Los Angeles Times and The New York Times 2024 Holiday Gift Guide.

== Career ==
Humphreys has written for such publications as The Hook C-Ville Weekly, Rue Morgue, True West Magazine, Filmfax, Video Watchdog, Psychotronic Video and L'Écran fantastique.

In addition to film writing Humphreys has provided commentary tracks for such films as Clint Eastwood's The Eiger Sanction and Two Mules for Sister Sara. As well as Roger Corman's The Little Shop of Horrors, It Came From Beneath the Sea, Battle of the Worlds, Weird Woman, Flight to Mars and Woody Allen's Play It Again, Sam.

In 2015, Humphreys accepted an award on behalf of late film director George Pal when Pal was inducted into the New Mexico Museum of Space History International Space Hall of Fame.

In November 2023, Humphreys was a special guest speaker at the Los Angeles Breakfast Club.

Humphreys co-wrote the Sophia Loren photography book Sophia by Eisenstaedt, published in 2026 by Taschen.

== Media ==
The New York Times, quoted Humphreys in an article about the death of actor L. Q. Jones and Jones' debut role as a soldier in the 1955 film Battle Cry, "“‘There’s one in every group,’ he tells us, as we see L.Q. mischievously giving one of the other soldiers-to-be a hotfoot,” adding, “There could have been no more perfect beginning to L.Q. Jones’s career in the movies. The word that best sums up his overriding screen persona is hellion.”"

Variety, writing about Humphrey's book LIFE. Hollywood, "The 600-page set features a treasure trove of images from Life’s extensive archives, along with essays by Justin Humphreys to provide vital context about each subject and the circumstances under which he, she or it was chronicled in its pages."

Creative Review said in a review of Humphrey's LIFE. Hollywood, "Attention has been paid to every little detail, to make the publication not just worthy of the classic films it contains, but also give it the care and artistry that went into making Life the groundbreaking magazine that it was."
