= Tubby the Tuba (1947 film) =

1947 film by George Pal

- Directed by: Direction: George Pal; Supervision: George E. Jordan
- Written by: Paul Tripp
- Produced by: George Pal
- Narrated by: Victor Jory
- Edited by: Photography: John S. Abbot
- Music by: Music: George Kleinsinger; Musical direction: Clarence Wheeler
- Animation by: William King (as W. King)
- Backgrounds by: Reginald Massie
- Distributed by: Paramount Pictures
- Release date: July 11, 1947
- Running time: 10 minutes
- Country: United States
- Language: English

Tubby the Tuba is a 1947 American animated short film from Paramount Pictures, directed by George Pal as part of his Puppetoons series. It was based on the original song by Paul Tripp and George Kleinsinger. The film features narration by Victor Jory.

The film received an Academy Award nomination for Best Animated Short, but lost to Warner Bros. Cartoons' Merrie Melodies cartoon Tweetie Pie. A feature-length version was released in 1975 by AVCO Embassy. The 1987 compilation feature, The Puppetoon Movie, featured the original short in its entirety.

== Plot ==
This story takes place in an orchestra featuring, among each other, a piccolo (Peepo), a flute, an oboe, a clarinet, a bassoon, a trumpet, a French horn, a trombone, a tuba (Tubby), a violin, a cello, a double bass, a xylophone, cymbals, a timpani and a celeste. Tubby, the orchestra's tuba, comments after a rehearsal's warmup that he is tired of playing only the bass line. This draws ridicule from the other instruments, and Tubby runs off crying to a nearby creek. A frog who lives there consoles Tubby; both are treated poorly, as neither is thought to be capable or worthy of a solo. The frog teaches Tubby a melody and the two part ways.

The next day, at the warmup, Tubby begins playing his newly learned melody. The orchestral instruments are shocked, but are encouraged to let the tuba have his solo by their conductor. With the frog's help, Tubby gets to play his solo.

== Production and release ==
The film was recorded in 1946 (according to the copyright notice), but remained unreleased for seven months until its final release on July 11, 1947. A shortened version of this film is featured in the Shining Time Station episode, "Finders Keepers".
