= Lucy Sante =

American writer, critic, and artist (born 1954)

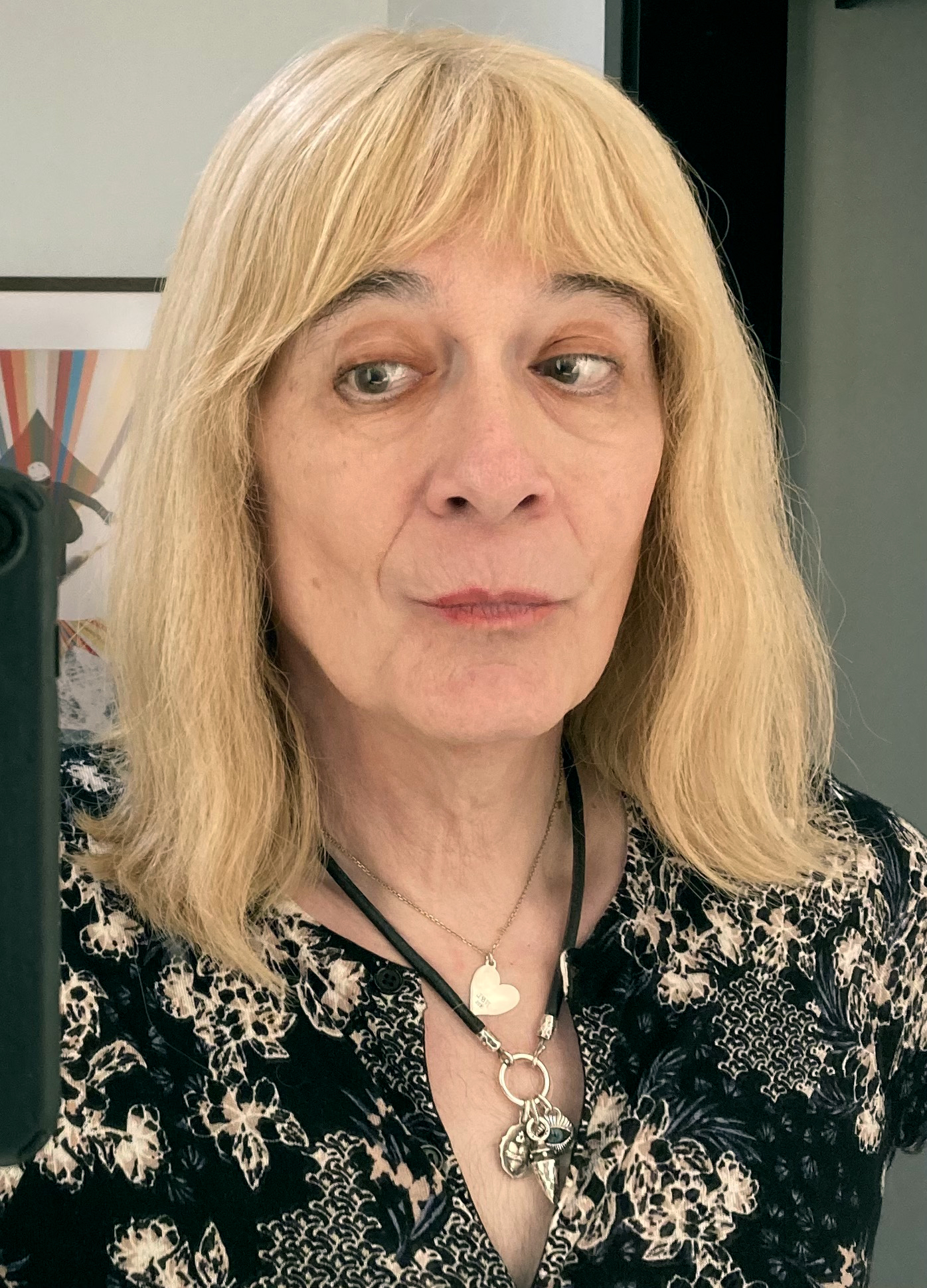
- Born: Luc Sante; May 25, 1954 (age 72); Verviers, Belgium
- Education: Columbia University
- Occupations: Writer, critic, artist
- Writing career
- Notable awards: Grammy Award for Best Album Notes (1998); Guggenheim Fellowship (1992); Whiting Award (1989)

Lucy Sante (pronounced Sahnt; formerly Luc Sante; born May 25, 1954) is a Belgian-born American writer, critic, and artist. She is a frequent contributor to The New York Review of Books. Her books include Low Life: Lures and Snares of Old New York (1991) and I Heard Her Call My Name: A Memoir of Transition (2024).

== Early life and education ==
Born in Verviers, Belgium, Sante migrated to the United States in the early 1960s. She attended Regis High School in Manhattan, and Columbia University from 1972 to 1976. Sante worked in the mailroom and then as assistant to editor Barbara Epstein at The New York Review of Books. She became a regular contributor there, writing about film, art, photography, and miscellaneous cultural phenomena, as well as book reviews.

== Career ==
Sante has written and edited books and written lyrics and liner notes.

Her books include Low Life: Lures and Snares of Old New York (1991), a non-fiction book documenting the life and politics of lower Manhattan from the mid-19th century to the early 20th century; Evidence (1992), the autobiographical The Factory of Facts (1998), Walker Evans (1999), Kill All Your Darlings: Pieces 1990-2005 (2007), Folk Photography (2009), The Other Paris (2015), Maybe the People Would Be the Times (2022), and Nineteen Reservoirs (2023). She co-edited O. K. You Mugs: Writers on Movie Actors with writer Melissa Holbrook Pierson, her former wife. Sante also translated and edited Félix Fénéon's Novels in Three Lines (2007) for the New York Review Books.

In the early 1980s, Sante wrote lyrics for the New York City-based band The Del-Byzanteens. She served as historical consultant on Martin Scorsese's 2002 film Gangs of New York, and, with Jem Cohen, made the short film Le Bled (Buildings in a Field) (2009). Sante has exhibited her collages at Picture Theory in Manhattan and elsewhere.

After teaching in the Columbia MFA writing program, Sante moved to Ulster County, New York, and taught writing and the history of photography at Bard College for 24 years before she retired in 2023. Sante's papers are stored at the New York Public Library Archives & Manuscripts Division.

== Personal life ==
Sante lived as a man until announcing that she was transitioning to being a woman in 2021. She wrote on her Instagram account: "Yes, this is me, and yes, I am transitioning–I have joined the other team. Yes, I've known since at least age 11 but probably earlier and yes, I suppressed and denied it for decades.... I started...hormone replacement therapy in early May....You can call me Lucy (but I won't freak out if you misgender me) and my pronoun, thankyouverymuch, is she."

In February 2022 she wrote an essay in the magazine Vanity Fair explaining her transition at almost 70 years old. Her 2024 memoir, I Heard Her Call My Name: A Memoir of Transition, follows her process of coming out; it was named one of the Ten Best Books of 2024 by the New York Times.and was a finalist for the 2025 Pulitzer Prize in Memoir/Autobiography. Sante has been married twice, and has a son.

== Publications ==
=== Books ===
- Low Life: Lures and Snares of Old New York. New York: Farrar Straus Giroux. 1991. ISBN 9780374194147.
- Evidence. New York: Farrar Straus Giroux/Noonday Press. 1992. ISBN 9780374523657.
- The Factory of Facts. New York: Pantheon. 1998. ISBN 9780679424109. Paperback edition: Vintage Books, 1999. ISBN 978-0679746508.
- Walker Evans. London: Phaidon. 1999. ISBN 9780714840475.
- Kill All Your Darlings: Pieces 1990-2005. Portland, OR: Yeti/Verse Chorus Press. 2007. ISBN 9781891241536.
- Folk Photography: The American Real-Photo Postcard, 1905–1930. Portland, OR: Yeti/Verse Chorus Press. 2009. ISBN 9781891241550. New edition: The Visible Spectrum, 2022. ISBN 9781953835185.
- The Other Paris. New York: Farrar Straus Giroux. 2015. ISBN 9780374299323.
- Maybe the People Would Be the Times. Portland, OR: Verse Chorus Press. 2020. ISBN 9781891241574.
- Nineteen Reservoirs: On Their Creation and the Promise of Water for New York City. New York: The Experiment. 2022. ISBN 9781615198658.
- I Heard Her Call My Name: A Memoir of Transition. New York: Penguin Press. 2024. ISBN 9780593493762.
- LIFE. Hollywood. Taschen. 2024. ISBN 9783836589598.

=== Chapbooks ===
- My Life in Poetry, 1970-1981. All-Seeing Eye. 2009.
- Twelve Sides. All-Seeing Eye. 2010.
- The Unknown Soldier. Lodger. 2018.
- Six Sermons for Bob Dylan. London: Tenement Press. 2024. ISBN 9781917304016.

=== Editor/Translator ===
- Fénéon, Félix (2007). Novels in Three Lines. New York: New York Review Books. ISBN 9781590172308.

=== Co-editor ===
- (with Melissa Holbrook Pierson): O.K. You Mugs: Writers on Movie Actors. New York: Pantheon. 1999. ISBN 9780375401015.

== Exhibitions ==
- Some Recent Collages, James Fuentes Gallery, 2020
- Two Strikes on a Snow Man, Picture Theory, New York City, 2026
- Knots, American Academy of Arts & Letters, New York City, 2026

== Awards and honors ==
- 1989: Whiting Award
- 1992–1993: Guggenheim Fellowship
- 1997: Literature Award from the American Academy of Arts and Letters
- 1998: Grammy for best album notes (Sante was one of the album note writers for the 1997 re-issue of the Anthology of American Folk Music)
- 2010: Infinity Award for writing, from the International Center of Photography, New York City
- 2012: Cullman Center Fellowship, New York Public Library
- 2014: MacDowell Fellowship
- 2023: Order of the Crown, Kingdom of Belgium
- 2024: MacDowell Fellowship
- 2026: Windham-Campbell Prize for Non-Fiction
