= Los Angeles Breakfast Club =

Los Angeles-based social club

- Formation: 1925
- Type: Social club
- Location: Griffith Park. Los Angeles, California, United States
- Website: www.labreakfastclub.com

The Los Angeles Breakfast Club is a nonpolitical, nonsectarian social club founded in 1925 that meets in Griffith Park, Los Angeles.

== History ==
=== Origins ===
The origins of the group began in the 1920s as a meeting for businessman who enjoyed riding their horses around Griffith Park. Around 1924, the group began including speakers and musicians, and on March 6, 1925, they held their first official meeting at the park’s Riding Academy. Maurice Demond was the group's first formal president. Early members included various businessmen and Hollywood industry leaders, including Edward Doheny, Louis B. Mayer, Jack and Harry Warner, Darryl F. Zanuck and Cecil B. DeMille. The club became a nonprofit in 1934, and opened its membership to women in 1981.

=== Location ===
When founded, the club quarters were housed at what had been the Crosetti Dairy Farm on Riverside Drive. In the 1930s, the club moved to the Ambassador Hotel, later building a clubhouse at 3207 Los Feliz Boulevard in 1934. The club maintained operations there until 1965, when it returned to its original location on Riverside Drive.

== Traditions and activities ==
=== Initiation ===
Initiation rites include a pledge ceremony in which the initiates sit on a sawhorse named Ham, wear a blindfold, and put a hand in a plate holding a sunny side up egg while taking an oath to the "democracy of ham and eggs."

=== Meetings ===
The LABC meets weekly on Wednesday mornings. Meetings begin with the pledge of allegiance, sing-alongs, and stretching. A cryptogram is recited at each meeting: "FVNEM? (Have we any ham? / SVFM (Yes we have ham) / FVNEX? (Have we any eggs?) / SVFX (Yes we have eggs) / OICVFMNX! (Oh I see we have ham and eggs!)". The group is also referred to under the tagline: "The Shrine of Friendship, the Temple of Sentiment and Idealism, where real people meet together to get better acquainted and start the day off right.” Members who sit at the "Rooster table" often lightly heckle speakers. The group meets at the Friendship Auditorium in Griffith Park. Visiting guests shake hands with LABC members who offer the greeting “Hello Ham!” and get the response “Hello Egg!

=== Symbols ===
Ham the Horse features in other club ephemera, as well as horseshoes, iron horses, the “hand of fellowship” and the “golden shovel." Other club symbols include the Golden Ruler and the Buried Hatchet.

== Organization ==
Weekly meetings are MC'd and chaired by members. There is a governing board, members, and presidents of the LABC. As of 2024, the LABC president is Mickey Corcoran.

== Notable members ==
- Rudolph Valentino
- Ronald Reagan
- Walt Disney
- L.E. Timberlake
- Justin Humphreys
