= Tulips Shall Grow =

1942 American animated short film directed by George Pal

- Directed by: George Pal (uncredited)
- Story by: Cecil Beard; George Pal; Jack Miller (all uncredited); Originated by: George Pal
- Produced by: George Pal
- Cinematography: George Pal
- Music by: Eddison von Ottenfeld
- Animation by: Chief animator: Ray Harryhausen (uncredited)
- Layouts by: Character designer: Wah Chang (uncredited)
- Color process: Black and White (black-and-white edition by National Telefilm Associates); Technicolor (original 3-strip Technicolor)
- Production company: George Pal Productions
- Distributed by: Paramount Pictures
- Release date: June 26, 1942
- Running time: 7 minutes
- Country: United States
- Language: English

Tulips Shall Grow is a 1942 American animated short film in the Puppetoons series, directed by George Pal and starring Rex Ingram and Victor Jory. It was released by Paramount Pictures and originally photographed in 3-strip Technicolor. It later became the black-and-white edition by National Telefilm Associates.

== Plot ==
A Dutch boy named Jan and a Dutch girl named Janette find their idyllic existence destroyed when they are overrun by a group of Nazi-like mechanical men called "The Screwballs", who lay waste to everything they touch. The Screwballs are later destroyed by a thunderstorm (the rain of which causes them to rust) and Jan and Janette's idyllic life resumes.

== Reception ==
The cartoon was nominated for the Oscar for Best Short Subject, Cartoons. In 1997, the film was selected for preservation in the United States National Film Registry by the Library of Congress as being "culturally, historically, or aesthetically significant".

It was also included in the 1987 compilation film The Puppetoon Movie.
