= Diver Dan =

Series of children's live-action shorts

Cover from Alpha Video's 2006 DVD release of Diver Dan.

Diver Dan is a series of 104 seven-minute live-action shorts made for children's television from 1960 to 1970. Made by Brian Cartoons, it was syndicated (mainly to NBC affiliates) and distributed by ITC Entertainment. The shows were sometimes re-edited into half-hour (including commercials) blocks by local stations.

The series featured the adventures of a diver in an old-fashioned diving suit who talked to the passing fish. The series was filmed in live action with puppet fish; the underwater effect was achieved by shooting through an aquarium.

== Production ==
Diver Dan debuted in 1960, the brainchild of Philadelphia, Pennsylvania, cartoonist J. Anthony (John) Ferlaine, as a spinoff of his comic strip, Fish Tales. Ferlaine, who worked as an art director at Philadelphia's CBS affiliate WCAU-TV, produced two Fish Tales live-action marionette pilots. When CBS did not pick up the show, Ferlaine and promoter Martin Young partnered with Philadelphia producer Louis W. Kellman, who with his staff produced local TV spots and film shorts and filmed NFL football games. They produced the shorts over nine months and syndicated them.

In New York City, Diver Dan shorts ran as part of Felix & Diver Dan, a 30-minute children's show airing from January 4, 1960, to August 31, 1962, which also included Felix the Cat. In Chicago during the 1960s, Diver Dan was regularly shown on the WGN-TV show "Ray Rayner and His Friends" even though Rayner would frequently read on-air letters from children requesting that he get other cartoons.

The series opening and closing themes were written, performed, and sung by the show's sound engineer, Jack Sky, in a double tracked recorded voice.

== Main cast ==
- Allen Swift as the voices of many puppets, the unseen Captain Murphy, and the narrator.
- Frank D Freda as Diver Dan.
- Suzanne Turner as Miss Minerva, a mermaid.

== Episodes ==
Ep. #	Episode title
01	Hard Water
02	Goldie The Goldfish
03	Talking Fish
04	Skippers Gold
05	Treasure Ship
06	Sawfish Rescue
07	Shell O Phone
08	The Octopus
09	Murder Ink
10	Bottomless Pit
11	Teetering Rock
12	Barons Capture
13	An Unusual Treasure
14	Triggers Revenge
15	An Unusual Fish
16	The Verdict
17	Horaces Dilemma
18	The Trap
19	The Trap Is Sprung
20	Riddle Of The Hermit Crab
21	Sargasso Sea
22	Lost In The Sargasso Sea
23	Current Flow
24	The Storm
25	Goldies Heroism
26	Dynamite
27	Ghost Is Clear
28	Captain Barney
29	Lost City
30	Secret Of The Throne
31	Crawling Danger
32	The Strange Fish
33	The Bomb
34	The Bubbling Pit
35	The Volcano
36	Depth Charge
37	School Daze
38	Strange Vines
39	Savage Seaweed
40	The Magnet

== Credits ==
- Produced by Louis W. Kellman
- A Brian Cartoons, Inc. production in association with Young Productions, Inc.
- Executive producer: Hal Tunis
- Associate producer: Harvey Blake
- Created by J. Anthony Ferlaine
- Writers included: Joseph Bonaduce, Ron Ronszel
- Puppeteers: Martin Kreiner, John Caracciolo, Harold Taylor, Alfred Sandstrom
- Directors: Leon Rhodes, Mort Heilig
- Production manager: Ben Berk
- Cameraman: Morris Kellman
- Script supervisor: Ruth Clyman
- Editors: Arthur Spieller, Margot Mor
- Sound: Jack Sky
- Art director: Frank Heininger
- Lighting: John Wynn

== DVD release ==
Alpha Video released two collections of Diver Dan episodes on DVD (Region 0). All episodes in both volumes are black & white.

Diver Dan (Catalog # ALP 5152D, UPC #0 89218 51529 2, Release Date September 26, 2006)

- 01 (Episode #34) THE BUBBLING PIT
- 02 (Episode #35) THE VOLCANO
- 03 (Episode #36) DEPTH CHARGE
- 04 (Episode #25) GOLDIE'S HEROISM
- 05 (Episode #26) DYNAMITE
- 06 (Episode #27) GHOST IS CLEAR
- 07 (Episode #37) SCHOOL DAZE
- 08 (Episode #38) STRANGE VINES
- 09 (Episode #39) SAVAGE SEAWEED
- 10 (Episode #12) BARON'S CAPTURE
- 11 (Episode #13) AN UNUSUAL TREASURE
- 12 (Episode #14) TRIGGER'S REVENGE
- 13 (Episode #20) RIDDLE OF THE HERMIT CRAB
- 14 (Episode #21) SARGASSO SEA
- 15 (Episode #22) LOST IN THE SARGASSO SEA

Diver Dan Volume 2 (Catalog # ALP 5710D, UPC #0 89218 57109 0)

- 01 (Episode #01) HARD WATER
- 02 (Episode #02) GOLDIE THE GOLDFISH
- 03 (Episode #03) TALKING FISH
- 04 (Episode #04) SKIPPER'S GOLD
- 05 (Episode #05) TREASURE SHIP
- 06 (Episode #06) SAWFISH RESCUE
- 07 (Episode #32) THE STRANGE FISH
- 08 (Episode #33) THE BOMB
- 09 (Episode #23) CURRENT FLOW
- 10 (Episode #24) THE STORM
- 11 (Episode #11) TEETERING ROCK
- 12 (Episode #40) THE MAGNET
- 13 (Episode #31) CRAWLING DANGER
- 14 (Episode #16) THE VERDICT
- 15 (Episode #17) HORACE'S DILEMMA

Three DVD (Region 0) releases have also been produced by East West Entertainment LLC. All episodes in all three volumes are black & white.

Diver Dan Vol. One (UPC #8 43156 02012 2)

- Episode #01 - HARD WATER
- Episode #02 - GOLDIE THE GOLDFISH
- Episode #03 - TALKING FISH
- Episode #04 - SKIPPER'S GOLD
- Episode #05 - TREASURE SHIP
- Episode #06 - SAWFISH RESCUE
- Episode #07 - SHELL-O-PHONE
- Episode #08 - THE OCTOPUS
- Episode #09 - MURDER INK

Note: Each of the first 8 episodes has its own chapter stop except for Episode #09. It continues immediately after Episode 08. Pressing >> skips Episode 09 and cycles back to Episode 01.

Diver Dan Vol. 2 (UPC #8 43156 02014 6)

- Episode #01 - HARD WATER
- Episode #02 - GOLDIE THE GOLDFISH
- Episode #03 - TALKING FISH
- Episode #04 - SKIPPER'S GOLD
- Episode #05 - TREASURE SHIP
- Episode #06 - SAWFISH RESCUE
- Episode #07 - SHELL-O-PHONE
- Episode #08 - THE OCTOPUS
- Episode #09 - MURDER INK

Note: Followed by five Van Beuren Corporation and three Fleischer Studios cartoons on Track 2.

Diver Dan Vol. 3 (UPC #8 43156 02015 3)

- Episode #19 - THE TRAP IS SPRUNG
- Episode #20 - RIDDLE OF THE HERMIT CRAB
- Episode #21 - SARGASSO SEA
- Episode #22 - LOST IN THE SARGASSO SEA
- Episode #23 - CURRENT FLOW

== In other media ==
Dell Publishing issued a Diver Dan comic book, as issue #1254 (February–April 1962) of its series Four Color. A follow-up issue, #2 was also published, dated June–August 1962.

In 1963, songwriter and record producer Tony Piano of Columbia Records put out a children's album based on the series titled Diver Dan and the Bermuda Onion, featuring comedian Del Close and children's album star Kay Lande.
