= John Henry and the Inky-Poo =

- Directed by: George Pal; Supervision: George E. Jordan
- Written by: Robert Monroe; Latham Ovens
- Starring: Rex Ingram
- Narrated by: Rex Ingram
- Cinematography: John S. Abbott
- Music by: Luvenia Nash Singers
- Animation by: Erwin Broner
- Backgrounds by: Reginald Massie
- Production company: George Pal Productions
- Distributed by: Paramount Pictures
- Release date: September 6, 1946
- Running time: 7 minutes
- Country: United States
- Language: English

John Henry and the Inky-Poo is a 1946 animated Puppetoons short directed by George Pal and supervised by George E. Jordan. The film is based on African American folk hero John Henry.

John Henry and the Inky-Poo was nominated for an Oscar for Best Animated Short for the 19th Academy Awards. In 2015, the film was selected for preservation in the United States National Film Registry by the Library of Congress as being "culturally, historically, or aesthetically significant".

It was also included in the 1987 compilation film The Puppetoon Movie.

== Reception ==
- The Film Daily (Aug 14, 1946): "In a departure from the fables dreamed up for the familiar scarecrow and the little pickaninny (Jasper) character, usually featured in this series. George Pal has produced an engaging Puppetoon version of the legendary figure, John Henry, drawn from the annals of American Folklore, who pitted his brawn and brains against the steam engine known as the Inky Poo to dispel the fear of his railroad coworkers that machines would eventually put them out of work. The Technicolor, Rex Ingram's narration, and the folk song delivered by the Luvenia Nash singers are all standouts".
- Boxoffice (Dec 9, 1946): "Excellent musical background is furnished by the Luvenia Nash Choral group in this take off on American folk story".
