= The Wonderful World of the Brothers Grimm =

1962 film by George Pal, Henry Levin

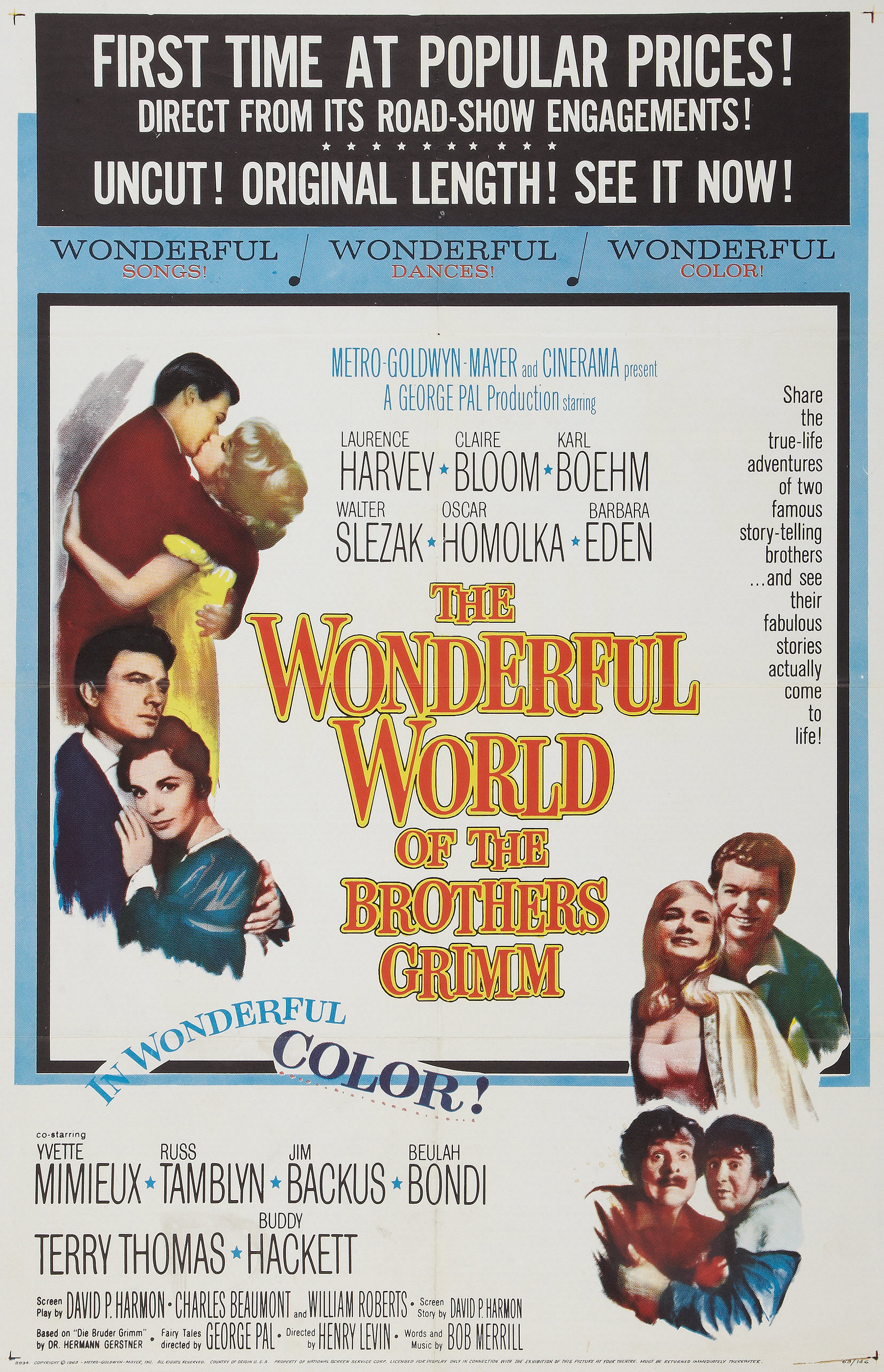
- Theatrical release poster
- Directed by: Henry Levin; George Pal (fairy tale sequences)
- Screenplay by: Charles Beaumont; William Roberts; David P. Harmon
- Story by: David P. Harmon
- Based on: Die Brüder Grimm; 1952 book by Hermann Gerstner
- Produced by: George Pal
- Starring: Laurence Harvey; Claire Bloom; Karl Boehm; Barbara Eden; Walter Slezak; Oscar Homolka; Yvette Mimieux; Russ Tamblyn; Jim Backus; Beulah Bondi; Terry-Thomas; Buddy Hackett
- Cinematography: Paul C. Vogel
- Edited by: Walter A. Thompson
- Music by: Leigh Harline; Bob Merrill (songs)
- Production companies: George Pal Productions; Avernus Productions
- Distributed by: Metro-Goldwyn-Mayer; Cinerama Releasing Corporation
- Release dates: August 7, 1962 (United States); September 19, 1963 (Berlin)
- Running time: 140 minutes
- Countries: United States; West Germany
- Language: English
- Budget: $6.25 million or $6 million
- Box office: $8.9 million

The Wonderful World of the Brothers Grimm is a 1962 American biographical fantasy film directed by Henry Levin and George Pal. The latter was the producer and also in charge of the stop motion animation. The film was one of the highest-grossing films of 1962. It won one Oscar and was nominated for three additional Academy Awards. The cast included several prominent actors—including Laurence Harvey, Karl Boehm, Jim Backus, Barbara Eden and Buddy Hackett.

It was filmed in the Cinerama process, which was photographed in an arc with three lenses, on a camera that produced three strips of film. Three projectors, in the back and sides of the theatre, produced a panoramic image on a screen that curved 146 degrees around the front of the audience.

== Plot ==
The story focuses on the Grimm brothers, Wilhelm and Jacob. As the film opens, we learn they are working to finish a family history for a local Duke, though Wilhelm is more interested in collecting fairy tales and often spends what little food money they earn to hear them from locals; we see a canny flower seller tempting Wilhelm successfully into buying a bouquet by telling him the tale of The Twelve Dancing Princesses (though in the film, it is changed to only one princess, and the fairy ball is changed to a camp of Romani dancing instead). Jacob is incensed by this, scolding his brother for wasting their bread money.

There is also a subplot with the local bookseller, Stossel, a friend of theirs, who constantly teases Jacob for how boring his books on grammar are, and chides them both to "write about girls" repeatedly, as books like that sell. When Jacob comes in to look in on how his books are doing, a girl, Greta Heinrich, tries to flirt with him; he doesn't notice, signing her copy of his book when she asks. Wilhelm notices, and through subterfuge gets her to visit their home, and leaves her and Jacob alone together. After some misunderstanding about who invited whom over, they fall in love.

Meanwhile, Wilhelm wants to write books of stories, not family histories OR books on grammar, and tries to prove to the bookseller that people want to read storybooks by telling the story of the The Cobbler and the Elves to him, some children, and some older ladies while they all sit in the bookshop. It appears to be somewhat successful, until the bookseller, Stossel, asks the children what money they have and finds out they have none. Wilhelm chides him for being so focussed on money, even as he chivvies them out of the shop.

The Duke calls both brothers into his palace to shout at them angrily for getting his history wrong--they have left out an obscure relation. He demands they go to research said relation immediately and add him to the history, stating his book must be perfect or he will look a fool to Wilhelm III, King of Prussia, whom he badly wants to impress.

There is an Intermission at this point in the film.

The brothers travel to another town on orders from the Duke, to correct information about an obscure third cousin. After collecting information from the local church, Wildhelm hears from the priest about an old woman named Anna Richter who lives in the woods and has been telling tales to the local children for generations. Wilhelm follows the children to find her, but she refuses to let him into her house, so he pretends to go away and then hides beneath her open window, getting out his paper and writing down the tale, "The Singing Bone", even when it starts raining heavily and he is soaked.

When the children leave, Wilhelm notices Anna Richter coughing and seeming to have trouble breathing. He comes inside and helps her sit down, fluffing a pillow to make her comfortable, and she warms to him, refusing his offer to fetch a doctor and instead telling him to get them both tea, commenting that he's soaked from the rain. He comments she's a wonderful storyteller and she makes known she knows a lot of stories, and he begs her to tell him, writing them all down. He loses track of time again until he hears the horn of the boat he's supposed to be on, the boat that will take them back to their home town. In his hurry, he runs across a stream carelessly and his briefcase is banged on a rock, making the bottom drop out, losing not only the stories but also the research for the Duke's book. He doesn't notice, meeting his brother on the dock and making his usual excuses about losing track of time, and his brother berates him. When Wilhelm tries to tell him he got the research done, he finds out about his briefcase and losing the stories. Jacob scolds him more and stalks off in a huff.

When he returns, we see the Duke abusing Wilhelm, with Gruber chiming in with yes-man comments as the Duke paces. We also see that Wilhelm seems unsteady and almost delirious with illness, coughing and barely able to stand up. Despite this, the Duke threatens that he must come up with six months of the rent the Duke was not charging him, in the next three days. On his way out of the room, Wilhelm faints, falling down a flight of stairs.

We find out in the next scene at the Grimms' house that Wilhelm has pneumonia, and his wife, sister-in-law, and the bookshop owner all worry about him, only to be visited by Gruber, demanding the rent. They angrily tell him Wilhelm is too sick to even be conscious, but this doesn't matter to Gruber, who insists that he's only following orders from the Duke. Jacob comes down the stairs and says he will sell all his own books in order to pay the rent, and the bookseller immediately says "sold!" and hustles Gruber out the door. Jacob goes back upstairs to Wilhelm's room, worried. Wilhelm, delirious with fever, raves about his guilt and the manuscript being lost.

Wilhelm dreams that at night various fairy tale characters come to him, begging him to name them before he dies. He gives some of them names, but they begin to fade before he is done; he lurches out of bed to try and get to them and falls, alerting his family, who race up the stairs and find out his fever is gone and he will live through the pneumonia. Jacob, finding a paper clutched in Wilhelm's hand, reads out "Once upon a time, there was a tiny little boy and his name was Tom Thumb". Much affected by his brother's near-death experience, Jacob promises to work with Wilhelm on the fairy tales, and continue to live with him. This upsets his fiancee, but Jacob insists that Wilhelm is his brother. He asks her to wait, but she does not want to, wanting him to choose between her and his brother. Jacob chooses his brother, and she leaves him to go home to Berlin.

Jacob returns home to his convalescing brother, handing him a small sheaf of papers and saying the flower-seller drives a hard bargain before telling Wilhelm the story is very good, and giving details of The Brave Little Tailor. Wilhelm says he amazed Jacob did this, and Jacob admits he once felt that way, but not anymore. Wilhelm's wife, Dorthea, asks dryly how Jacob feels about Greta. He says they have reached an understanding. When Dorthea mentions Greta came to say goodbye and was weeping, Jacob covers his own heartbreak by saying dismissively that emotional goodbyes are for women, and that their emotions blind them to practical matters. When Dorthea presses, he says he needs Wilhelm to complete his work and Wilhelm needs him to complete the stories. As Jacob is going upstairs, Wilhelm and Dorthea's two children come down, begging for a story. Their mother and Jacob shush them, saying their father is too ill to tell them a story; when they try to plead and insist, Jacob herds them back upstairs, telling them to stop complaining. They insist Wilhelm is better now, but Jacob doesn't tolerate any of their guff. When he says he will tell them a story, they laugh at him, saying he doesn't know any; he says they're wrong, that he just heard one from the flower-seller. They ask what it cost him. Thoughtfully, he looks into the middle distance, clearly thinking of the recent events, and says only, "Enough."

In the next scene--the beginning of a montage--we see both brothers sitting at adjacent desks and writing. From out of Wilhelm's desk we see the titles of stories: Tom Thumb, Rapunzel, Snow White, and more; from Jacob's, two titles of grammar books. In the ensuing montage, we see Wilhelm collecting lots of stories from people out on the streets. Meanwhile, Jacob still works on his own projects. We see that Jacob's books are taught in schools; Wilhelm's are read by parents to their children. The brothers at first work separately, but then closer and closer together, until they are using the same desk. The montage stops with Dorthea rushing in from the other room, saying the Duke has arrived; they wonder why, as they have been paying their elevated rent.

Much to their surprise, the Duke seems in high spirits, praising Jacob and asking after Wilhelm's health before dragging Jacob into the next room without hearing their answers, presenting Mr Dantino from Berlin, who has been commissioned by King Wilhelm III to inform the Grimm brothers they have been elected to receive membership at the Berlin Royal Academy. It comes out in the course of Dantino presenting them with membership that their friend Stossel, the bookseller, told Dantino all about them. They are all very excited to go to the induction ceremony in Berlin until they read the invitation and find only Jacob's books are mentioned. Dantino asks if there's something wrong with the invitation, and Wilhelm says there's no mention of the fairy tales. Dantino professes not to know anything about the fairy tales while the Duke ridicules Wilhelm once again about them; Wilhelm lies and says it isn't important, clearly very discouraged, as the Duke repeats "Dogs and frogs and hags and dragons" mockingly.

In the next scene, we see a very early steam train going through the countriside to Berlin. Inside, the Grimm family--Wilhelm, Jacob, Dorthea, and the two children--are sitting with their luggage. The children exclaim about the sign and getting close to Berlin while their mother shushes them. Jacob looks preoccupied and angry, while Wilhelm watches his family. When Dorthea admonishes the children to settle down and "let Uncle Jacob think what he's going to say", Jacob interjects that he's already thought what he's going to say, and begins a speech that calls the honour of membership an outrage. Dorthea comments that isn't very polite and Wilhelm adds it also isn't sensible. Jacob remains firm--they insulted Wilhelm, who did equal work and deserves equal honour. Wilhelm warns Jacob that sharing honour means sharing his reputation as "a loony"; Dorthea hushes him and says Wilhelm is nothing of the sort. Wilhelm insists that they are being honoured for Jacob's work, not his, and that Jacob was right about the fairy tales. Jacob prepares to make a speech deliberately insulting the academy for snubbing Wilhelm, but Wilhelm insists--"just tell them I'm your brother".

As their train pulls into the station, and the solemn representatives of the Royal Academy begin their speech of welcome, they are drowned out by hordes of children cheering as they arrive, chanting, "We want a story". Jacob smiles and leans in to tell Wilhelm, "Just tell them I'm your brother."

Wilhelm motions for silence, and begins, "Once upon a time, there were two brothers". The children cheer, and the film ends with a caption card that reads "…and they lived happily ever after".

== Cast ==
- Laurence Harvey - Wilhelm Grimm / The Cobbler ("The Cobbler and the Elves")
- Karl Boehm - Jacob Grimm
- Claire Bloom - Dorothea Grimm
- Walter Slezak - Stossel
- Barbara Eden - Greta Heinrich
- Oskar Homolka - The Duke (as Oscar Homolka)
- Martita Hunt - Anna Richter (storyteller)
- Betty Garde - Miss Bettenhausen
- Bryan Russell - Friedrich Grimm
- Ian Wolfe - Gruber
- Walter Rilla - Priest
- Yvette Mimieux - The Princess ("The Dancing Princess")
- Russ Tamblyn - The Woodsman ("The Dancing Princess")/ Tom Thumb (in Wilhelm's dream)
- Jim Backus - The King ("The Dancing Princess")
- Beulah Bondi - The Gypsy ("The Dancing Princess")
- Terry-Thomas - Sir Ludwig ("The Singing Bone")
- Buddy Hackett - Hans ("The Singing Bone")
- Otto Kruger - The King at Ludwig's Trial ("The Singing Bone")
- Arnold Stang - Rumplestiltskin (in Wilhelm's dream)
- Stan Freberg, Thurl Ravenscroft and Dal McKennon - The Elves (Puppetoons voices) ("The Cobbler and the Elves")
- Peter Whitney - The Giant (uncredited)
- Tammy Marihugh - Pauline Grimm
- Cheerio Meredith - Mrs. Von Dittersdorf
- Eduard Linkers - Painter (uncredited)
- Gregory Morton - Michael Dantino

== Production ==
=== Development ===
In the mid-1950s, George Pal left Paramount Studios, which had been his base for a number of years. In March 1956, he announced the formation of his own company, Galaxy Pictures, saying he would make six films, including an adaptation of The Time Machine written by David Duncan; Captain Cook, based on the novel Lost Eden; a film about Atlantis; and The Brothers Grimm, based on a script by David Harmon adapted from a biography of the brothers by Dr Hermann Gerstner. (Pal had bought the screen rights to Gerstner's biography in February 1956 and hired Harmon in March.)

Pal signed an agreement with MGM to finance Galaxy's slate, the first film produced being Tom Thumb (1958), based on a Grimm fairytale. In 1957, Pal announced he wanted Grimm to follow Tom Thumb with Alan Young and Eddie Bracken in the leading roles. In April 1958, he signed Mary Brown to do the costumes.

However, in May 1958, after discussions with MGM, Pal decided to make The Time Machine (1960) instead.

In August 1959, Pal announced that key roles would be played by Russ Tamblyn, Alan Young, and Yvette Mimieux. Tamblyn would make the film - which would be shot in Europe - after he got out of the army. In December 1959, Pal was reportedly seeking Bing Crosby for a lead role. That month, Stan Freberg was reportedly adding "special material" to the film.

In July 1960, Hedda Hopper reported that Pal would make the film in America, not Europe.

Pal then delayed the film again so that he could make Atlantis, the Lost Continent. In August 1960, it seemed the film would be postponed indefinitely when Pal announced he intended to make The Return of the Time Machine. However, that film was postponed (it would never be made) and, in January 1961, Pal announced Grimm would definitely be his next film.

=== Casting ===
Pal wanted to cast Peter Sellers and Alec Guinness as the brothers, but was over-ruled by the studio.

In March 1961, MGM reported Edmund Hartmann was working on the final script. In March 1961, Pal confirmed Alan Young would appear in the movie.

In April, Laurence Harvey was cast as William Grimm. The same month, Karl Boehm was cast as his brother with Yvette Mimieux to play his wife.

Mimieux wound up playing the dancing princess in the film while Barbara Eden was borrowed from 20th Century Fox to play Boehm's love interest.

In addition to playing the Woodsman, Russ Tamblyn also reprises his role as Tom Thumb, from Pal's 1958 film.

=== Cinerama ===
The Wonderful World of the Brothers Grimm was produced and exhibited in the original three-panel Cinerama widescreen process. MGM had signed a deal with Cinerama to make four films that attempted to tell a cohesive story, unlike previous productions, which had all been travelogues. How the West Was Won would be the first film and, in March 1961, MGM announced Grimm would be the second. (After these two a single-lens Cinerama was used for narrative films.)

George Pal said three fairy tales were chosen which would look good in Cinerama. He also wanted to use lesser-known fairy tales so the audience did not know how they ended: The Dancing Princess, The Cobbler and the Elves and The Singing Bone.

=== Shooting ===
Pal left for Munich in April 1961, saying he will use "every trick in the books" in the film. "We hope to get some wonderful special effects especially."

Filming started 1 July 1961 (How the West Was Won started in June.) It took place on location in Bavaria, at Rothenberg and Dinkelsbühl. (Kassel, where the Grimms lived, had been bombed out.) After two months filming in West Germany, the unit returned to Hollywood. Henry Levin directed the Grimm brothers sequences while Pal did the fairytale ones.

== Reception ==
=== Box office ===
By September 1962, the film had been seen by a million people, 60% of them adults.

The Wonderful World of the Brothers Grimm grossed $8.9 million at the box office, earning $6.5 million in US theatrical rentals. It was the 13th highest-grossing film of 1962. Pal estimated the film needed to make at least $13 million to be profitable.

=== Critics ===
- "spectacularly beautiful scenic delights," the three stories have "enchanting, spellbinding moments . . . but also a tendency to drag," "lackluster depiction of the Grimm brothers' lives" - Ben Kubasik, Newsday
- "enchanting production," "the story itself will charm the hearts of the young-in-years-and-spirit," "the legends are imaginatively realized on the screen" - Kate Cameron, New York Daily News

=== Accolades ===
The film won an Oscar and was nominated for three more:

==== Won ====
- Best Costume Design, Color - Mary Wills

==== Nominated ====
- Best Art Direction-Set Decoration, Color - George Davis, Edward Carfagno, Henry Grace, Dick Pefferle (lost to John Box, John Stoll, and Dario Simoni for Lawrence of Arabia)
- Best Cinematography, Color - Paul C. Vogel (lost to Freddie Young for Lawrence of Arabia)
- Best Music, Scoring of Music, Adaptation or Treatment - Leigh Harline (lost to Ray Heindorf for The Music Man)

== Legacy ==
Pal wanted to cast Laurence Harvey in the title role of his next film, 7 Faces of Dr. Lao, but wound up using Tony Randall instead.

== Preservation status ==
Original high quality elements for the film are damaged and incomplete, and scattered among various international archives. The original negatives were left neglected with water damage and various other defects. The cost of a full digital scan and restoration of the best surviving elements was estimated by film preservationist Robert A. Harris at between $1 million to $2 million.

In an introduction to a Cinerama Holiday screening on 11 October 2020 at Pictureville, National Science and Media Museum in Bradford, West Yorkshire, England, then-ongoing digital restoration work of The Wonderful World of the Brothers Grimm was described, and snippets shown as well as the intention to have it ready for a digital Cinerama screening at the 2021 Widescreen Weekend festival in Bradford. No film print had been planned up to that point due to the prohibitive cost.

== Home media ==
MGM/UA Home Video released the film on VHS and LaserDisc in the U.S. in 1989 and 1992, respectively, and on LaserDisc in Japan in 1997. Since then, other than a bootleg Italian DVD from a low quality source, there were no further releases on home media for many years.

David Strohmeier announced a current restoration of this film, in collaboration with Warner Bros. (current owners of the pre-1986 MGM library via Turner Entertainment Co.) and Cinerama, Inc. Work began in November 2019. All the damaged elements were repaired and Strohmeier reports the resulting film looks like it was filmed yesterday. Restoration credit is shown over the exit music. The restoration was shown at the Museum of Modern Art on 23 January 2022. Warner Archive released the film on Blu-ray on 29 March 2022 in a deluxe 2-disc special edition containing both Smilebox and letterbox versions (like the How the West Was Won Blu-ray).

In addition, the film is also made available for streaming online on Fox Corporation-owned AVOD/FAST service Tubi and Plex.

== Comic book adaptation ==
- Gold Key: The Wonderful World of the Brothers Grimm (October 1962)

== See also ==
- List of American films of 1962
- The Brothers Grimm (2005)
- List of stop-motion films
- How the West Was Won (1962) The only other story-driven movie filmed in true three-lens Cinerama
