= Puppetoons =

1930s–1940s animated puppet film series

- Directed by: George Pal
- Written by: Jack Miller
- Produced by: George Pal
- Production company: George Pal Productions
- Distributed by: Paramount Pictures

Puppetoons is a series of animated puppet films made in Europe (1930s) and in the United States (1940s) by George Pal. They were made using replacement animation: using a series of different hand-carved wooden puppets (or puppet heads or limbs) for each frame in which the puppet moves or changes expression, rather than moving a single puppet, as is the case with most stop motion puppet animation. They were particularly made from 1932 to 1947, in both Europe and the US.

== History ==
The Puppetoons series of animated puppet films were made in Europe in the 1930s and in the United States in the 1940s. The series began when George Pal made an advertising film using "dancing" cigarettes in 1932, which led to a series of theatrical advertising shorts for Philips Radio in the Netherlands. This was followed by a series for Horlicks Malted Milk in England. These shorts have an art deco design, often reducing characters to simple geometric shapes.

Pal arrived in the U.S. in 1940, and produced more than 40 Puppetoons films for Paramount Pictures between 1941 and 1947. It was initially named Madcap Models. At one point, the series enjoyed greater popularity than hand-drawn cartoons produced by Fleischer Studios and Famous Studios, which were also distributed by Paramount but suffered from a decline in output quality.

Seven Puppetoons films received Academy Award nominations, including Rhythm in the Ranks (for the year 1941), Tulips Shall Grow (1942), The 500 Hats of Bartholomew Cubbins (1943), And To Think I Saw it On Mulberry Street (1944), Jasper and the Beanstalk (1945), John Henry and the Inky-Poo (1946) and Tubby the Tuba (1947).

The series ended due to rising production costs which had increased from US$18,000 per short in 1939 (equivalent to $326,532 in 2025) to almost US$50,000 following World War II (equivalent to $628,558 in 2025). Paramount Pictures—Pal's distributor—objected to the cost. Per their suggestion, Pal went to produce sequences for feature films. In 1956, the Puppetoons as well as most of Paramount's shorts, were sold to television distributor U.M. & M. TV Corporation. National Telefilm Associates bought out U.M. & M. and continued to syndicate them in the 1950s and 1960s as "Madcap Models".

Pal also used the Puppetoon name and the general Puppetoon technique for miniature puppet characters in some of his live-action feature films, including The Great Rupert (1949), Tom Thumb (1958), and The Wonderful World of the Brothers Grimm (1963). In these films, the individual wooden figures were billed as The Puppetoons.

== Technique ==
Puppetoon films used replacement animation with puppets. Using a series of different hand-carved wooden puppets (or puppet heads or limbs) for each frame in which the puppet moves or changes expression, rather than moving a single puppet. A typical Puppetoon required 9,000 individually carved and machined wooden figures or parts. Puppetoon animation is a type of replacement animation, which is itself a type of stop-motion animation. The puppets are rigid and static pieces; each is typically used in a single frame and then switched with a separate, near-duplicate puppet for the next frame. Thus puppetoon animation requires many separate figures. It is thus more analogous in a certain sense to cel animation than is traditional stop-motion: the characters are created from scratch for each frame (though in cel animation the creation process is simpler since the characters are drawn and painted, not sculpted).

== Jasper ==
Some controversy exists in modern times, as the black character, Jasper, star of several Puppetoons in the 1940s is considered a stereotype today. The Jasper series of shorts relied on a small, consistent cast. Jasper is a playful boy similar in personality to Bosko after the latter was redesigned. His mother is a protective mammy. Jasper is often accompanied by a Scarecrow who acted as a black scam artist, with the Blackbird serving as his fast-talking partner-in-crime. He was initially voiced by child actor Glenn Leedy before he was replaced by Sara Berner after the former went through puberty. Pal described Jasper as the Huckleberry Finn of American folklore.

Already in 1946, an article of the Hollywood Quarterly protested that the Jasper shorts presented a "razor-totin', ghost-haunted, chicken-stealin' concept of the American Negro". A 1947 article in Ebony pointed out that George Pal was a European and not raised on racial prejudice: "To him there is nothing abusive about a Negro boy who likes to eat watermelons or gets scared when he goes past a haunted house". The article, though, pointed that this depiction touched on the stereotypes of Negroes being childish, eating nothing but molasses and watermelons, and being afraid of their own shadows.

Jasper's full name is Jasper Jefferson Lincoln Washington Hawkins.

At one point, Jasper's popularity was on par with Mickey Mouse's and Donald Duck's.

== Legacy and preservation ==
In 1987, film producer-director-archivist Arnold Leibovit, a friend of George Pal, collected several Puppetoons and released them theatrically and to video as The Puppetoon Movie, reintroducing them to contemporary audiences. A feature-length documentary on the life and films of George Pal followed, The Fantasy Film Worlds of George Pal. In 2020 and 2023, The Puppetoon Movie Volume 2 and The Puppetoon Movie Volume 3 was released on Blu-ray and DVD, featuring 17 shorts and over 30 shorts on the latter not included on The Puppetoon Movie original film release. The Puppetoon Movie Volume 3 is a Rondo Award Winner for Best Blu-ray Collection of 2024.

The Academy Film Archive preserved several of the Puppetoons in 2009, including Jasper and the Beanstalk, John Henry and the Inky Poo, and Rhythm In the Ranks.

== Filmography ==
=== European shorts ===
==== 1932 ====
No.	Title	Original release date
1	Midnight	1932

==== 1934 ====
No.	Title	Original release date
2	Philips Cavalcade (a.k.a. Cavalcade of Music)	February 2, 1934
3	The Ship of the Ether	March 6, 1934

==== 1935 ====
No.	Title	Original release date
4	The Magic Atlas	February 2, 1935
5	The Sleeping Beauty	May 31, 1935
6	Ali Baba and The Forty Thieves	July 26, 1935
7	In Lamp Light Land (a.k.a. In Lamplightland)	November 22, 1935

==== 1936 ====
No.	Title	Original release date
8	On Parade!	January 1, 1936
9	Aladdin and the Magic Lamp	February 2, 1936
10	Ether Symphony	June 17, 1936

==== 1937 ====
No.	Title	Original release date
11	What Ho, She Bumps (a.k.a. Captain Kidding)	March 11, 1937
12	The Reddingsbrigade (a.k.a. Rescue Brigade)	July 10, 1937

==== 1938 ====
No.	Title	Original release date
13	The Ballet of Red Radio Valves	April 15, 1938
14	How An Advertising Poster Came About (a.k.a. Hoe Een Reclame-Affiche Ontstond)	April 22, 1938
15	South Sea Sweethearts	June 22, 1938
16	Sky Pirates	June 24, 1938
17	Philips Broadcast of 1938 (a.k.a. De Groote Philips Revue)	November 13, 1938

==== 1939 ====
No.	Title	Original release date
18	Love on the Range	1939

=== American shorts ===
==== 1941 ====
No.	Title	Original release date
19	Western Daze	January 7, 1941
20	Dipsy Gypsy	April 4, 1941
21	Hoola Boola	June 27, 1941
22	The Gay Knighties	August 22, 1941
23	Rhythm in the Ranks	December 26, 1941

==== 1942 ====
No.	Title	Original release date
24	Jasper and the Watermelons	February 26, 1942
25	The Sky Princess	March 27, 1942
26	Mr. Strauss Takes a Walk	May 8, 1942
27	Tulips Shall Grow	June 26, 1942
28	Jasper and the Haunted House	October 23, 1942

==== 1943 ====
No.	Title	Original release date
29	Jasper and the Choo-Choo	January 1, 1943
30	Bravo, Mr. Strauss	February 26, 1943
31	The 500 Hats of Bartholomew Cubbins	April 30, 1943
32	Jasper's Music Lesson	May 21, 1943
33	The Truck That Flew	August 6, 1943
34	The Little Broadcast	September 25, 1943
35	Jasper Goes Fishing	October 8, 1943
36	Goodnight Rusty	December 3, 1943

==== 1944 ====
No.	Title	Original release date
37	Package for Jasper	January 28, 1944
38	Say Ah, Jasper	March 10, 1944
39	And to Think That I Saw It on Mulberry Street	July 28, 1944
40	Jasper Goes Hunting	July 28, 1944
41	Jasper's Paradise	October 13, 1944
42	Two-Gun Rusty	December 1, 1944

==== 1945 ====
No.	Title	Original release date
43	Hotlip Jasper	January 5, 1945
44	Jasper Tell	March 23, 1945
45	Jasper's Minstrels	May 25, 1945
46	A Hatful of Dreams	July 6, 1945
47	Jasper's Booby Traps	August 3, 1945
48	Jasper's Close Shave	September 28, 1945
49	Jasper and the Beanstalk	October 19, 1945
50	My Man Jasper	December 14, 1945

==== 1946 ====
No.	Title	Original release date
51	Olio for Jasper	January 25, 1946
52	Together in the Weather	March 22, 1946
53	John Henry and the Inky-Poo	September 6, 1946
54	Jasper's Derby	September 20, 1946
55	Jasper in a Jam	October 18, 1946

==== 1947 ====
No.	Title	Original release date
56	Sweet Pacific	1947
57	Shoe Shine Jasper	February 28, 1947
58	Wilbur the Lion	April 18, 1947
59	Tubby the Tuba	July 11, 1947
60	Romeow and Julicat (shown in the film Variety Girl)	August 29, 1947
61	Date with Duke (featuring Duke Ellington)	October 31, 1947
62	Rhapsody in Wood (featuring Woody Herman)	December 29, 1947

==== 1971 ====
No.	Title	Original release date
63	The Tool Box (broadcast on Curiosity Shop)	September 2, 1971

== Cancelled projects ==
- Sinbad
- Three Little Princes
- Gulliver's Travels
- Casey Jones
- Davy Crockett
- Johnny Appleseed

== See also ==
- The Puppetoon Movie

== Sources ==
- Cripps, Thomas (1993), Making Movies Black: The Hollywood Message Movie from World War II to the Civil Rights Era, Oxford University Press, ISBN 978-0-19-536034-9
- Cohen, Karl F. (2004), "Racism and Resistance: Stereotypes in Animation", Forbidden Animation: Censored Cartoons and Blacklisted Animators in America, McFarland & Company, ISBN 978-0786420322
