= Paul Tripp =

American musician, author, and actor

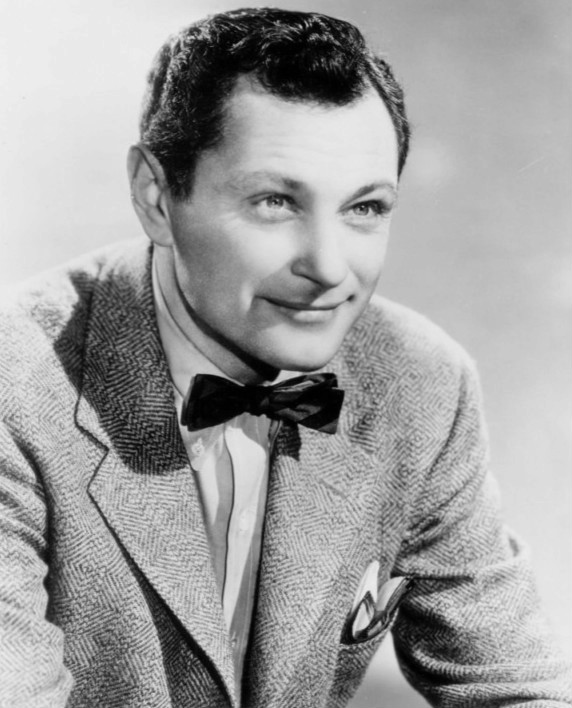
- Tripp in 1961
- Born: February 20, 1911; New York City, New York
- Died: August 29, 2002 (aged 91); New York City, New York
- Occupations: Musician; Actor; Author
- Spouse: Ruth Enders Tripp

Paul Tripp (February 20, 1911 – August 29, 2002) was an American children's musician, author, songwriter, and television and film actor. He collaborated with a fellow composer, George Kleinsinger. Tripp was the creator of the 1945 "Tubby the Tuba", a piece of classical music for children that has become his best-known work. He authored several books, including Rabbi Santa Claus and Diary of a Leaf.

== Early years ==
Tripp was born in New York City. Tripp attended Brooklyn College and City College of the City University of New York, and he held a master's degree in education. During World War II, he served in the Army Signal Corps.

== Career ==
Early in his career, he was the host of Mr. I. Magination, which was aired by CBS from 1949 to 1952 featuring him as a train engineer who took children through a tunnel to meet with representatives of different occupations. Tripp later co-hosted Birthday House with singer-composer Kay Lande, a live (later taped) daily morning children's show on WNBC that aired in New York for four years, starting in 1963. A book of his, The Christmas That Almost Wasn't, was produced as a movie in Rome in 1966, for which Tripp provided the screenplay and played a lead role.

Tripp and his wife, Ruth Enders Tripp, used many avenues to engage children in educational activities and collaborated on many educational programs for children. Among those programs, they hosted a TV news magazine for teens titled On The Carousel, which was seen Saturday mornings on the CBS TV network from June 5, 1955, to September 26, 1959.

Every week the Tripps would engage their viewers and studio audiences in craftmaking, hobbies, science projects, art, history, and musical and dramatic offerings...including a live presentation of "Tubby The Tuba".

On The Carousel won the NYC Emmy for "Best Children's Educational TV Series" in 1957.

Tripp hosted two children's TV shows - It's Magic! which was seen Saturday nights on CBS TV during the summer of 1955, and he also would serve as the second host and performer of the WOR TV Channel 9 Looney Tunes Show weekday evenings from Monday January 12, 1959 to Friday July 10, 1959. In 1963, Tripp and his wife created Birthday House, on which one fortunate New York area child would get to celebrate his or her birthday with their friends at a fictitious enchanted cottage where the Tripps led them in educational games, introduced them to celebrities, sang songs, and enjoyed gifts and a birthday cake wheeled out toward the end of the show. Birthday House aired from April 1963 through September 1967. It earned WNBC a special award at the 1964 New York City Emmys for quality children's programming. Ruth Enders Tripp died in 1999.

Tripp's final recording project was released in 1996 on Angel/EMI Records as Tubby the Tuba and Friends. The orchestral tracks "Tubby the Tuba", "The Story of Celeste", "Adventures of a Zoo", and "Peepo the Piccolo" were recorded by the Radio Orchestra of Bratislava under the baton of Stephen Gunzenhauser. A final track, "Tubby the Tuba Meets a Jazz Band", was recorded in New York City with Bob Stewart on tuba, Jimmy Owens on trumpet, Paquito D'Rivera on clarinet, Marco Katz on trombone, Chuck Folds on piano, John Thomas on percussion, and Oliver Jackson on drums. Paul Tripp is the narrator on this recording. Several of the same instrumental tracks appear on a 2006 release called Play it Happy on Koch Records that features Meredith Vieira on "Tubby the Tuba" and "Tubby the Tuba Meets a Jazz Band"," and Tripp on "The Story of Celeste".

He also acted in other dramas on television, in the theater, and in movies. Among his television appearances were two 1962 roles on the TV series Perry Mason, which starred Raymond Burr. First, he played Howard Langley in "The Case of the Lonely Eloper"; then, he played Steven Banks in "The Case of the Double-Entry Mind". Tripp also appeared in The Twilight Zone as an extraterrestrial in "The Fugitive" (Season 3, Episode 25).

Tripp also appeared on an episode of The Dick Van Dyke Show, "Sally Is a Girl". Tripp played the part of Ted Harris, a would-be boyfriend for Sally Rogers.

== Broadway ==
Tripp's Broadway credits included The 49th Cousin (1960), Seeds in the Wind (1948), Temper the Wind (1946), Army Play-by Play (1943), Jeremiah (1939), An Enemy of the People (1937), and Cyrano de Bergerac (1936).

== Death ==
On August 29, 2002, Tripp died in Manhattan of natural causes at 91. The Tripps had two children, Suzanne (Jurmain) and David.
