= George Kleinsinger =

American composer (1914–1982)

George Kleinsinger (February 13, 1914 – July 28, 1982) was an American composer mostly known for children's compositions, Broadway scores, and film/television scores. He is best-known for a string of children's compositions in collaboration with lyricist Paul Tripp (most notably Tubby the Tuba) and a series of works in collaboration with Joe Darion (including the musical Shinbone Alley) based on Don Marquis' Archy and Mehitabel columns.

== Biography ==
=== Early life, career, and death ===
Born in San Bernardino, California to a Polish-Jewish family. In 1930, Kleinsinger graduated from DeWitt Clinton High School. He earned a B.A. degree in music from New York University, then further studied composition at Juilliard. He began his career playing in bands on the Borscht Belt, including playing with trumpeter Frankie Newton.

He collaborated with Paul Tripp on a number of orchestral/vocal works for a young audience, beginning with "Tubby the Tuba".

In 1948, he wrote music for the original Max Fleischer/Jam Handy animated adaptation of Rudolph the Red-Nosed Reindeer. This led to him being commissioned to set the song to music for the 1964 Rankin-Bass adaptation. The producers elected to use the Johnny Marks version of the song, but Kleinsinger retained partial songwriting credit; the resulting royalties made him wealthy. Kleinsinger's version of the song was released by RCA on a 1964 LP sung by Paul Wing with Russ Case's orchestra.

In the early 1950s, he co-founded the Roslyn Chamber Music Group with Robert Bernstein and Leonid Hambro with the goal of attracting the highest caliber chamber musicians to perform in Long Island.

He scored dozens of television shows, movies, and documentaries in the 1950s and 1960s for various studios. The most famous works include John Brown's Body for CBS, Greece: The Golden Age for which he was nominated for an Emmy, and the labor documentary The Inheritance, whose title song was performed by Judy Collins and a chorus that included Pete Seeger.

He had a long association with musical adaptions of Don Marquis' lower-case archy and mehitabel newspaper columns. This began with a 1954 concept record album Archy & Mehitabel starring Carol Channing, and included a 1954 opera premiered by the Little Orchestra Society, the 1957 Broadway musical Shinbone Alley (which ran for 49 performances featuring Eddie Bracken and Eartha Kitt), and the 1970 film adaptation Shinbone Alley. Stephen Schwartz, who was Kleinsinger's neighbor in Roslyn, was inspired by the musical to become a composer.

In addition to the numerous children's and programmatic compositions, Kleinsinger composed more traditional Western classical music, including a cello concerto and a quintet for clarinet and strings.

For the last 25 years of his life, he was a notable resident of New York's Chelsea Hotel. He befriended his neighbor Brendan Behan and wrote his Brendan Behan Suite which features tape recordings of Behan singing that he surreptitiously made. Their friendship was documented in Janet Behan's play Brendan at the Chelsea. He wrote film scores for his neighbor Doris Totten Chase. He gained notoriety for his hobby of recreating a tropical environment (along animals) in the apartment, including keeping iguana, tarantulas, walking catfish, turtles, exotic birds, and a baby hippo. In 1972 this was the subject of Harry Reasoner television documentary Who Do You Think You Are? – Man and Beast. Kleinsinger reported that his second wife gave him an ultimatum between his marriage or his apartment. Sculptures of Kleinsinger and other Chelsea residents by Eugenie Gershoy still hang in the Chelsea lobby.

He was married three times. He died of cancer in New York City in 1982. A memorial service was held the next week at Judson Memorial Church; his wife spread his ashes on Chelsea Hotel's rooftop garden.

== Selected works ==
- Joy of Living, an early work, a suite for orchestra.
- I Hear America Singing, cantata, text by Walt Whitman, Kleinsinger's first work to be recorded in 1941, sung by John Charles Thomas, the ILGWU Radio Chorus, and the Victor Symphony Orchestra conducted by Nathaniel Shilkret.
- Victory Against Heaven (1941), one-act opera. Libretto by Winthrop Bushnell. Premiered January 1941 at the Avery Memorial Museum in Hartford, Connecticut.
- Western Rhapsody
- Dude Ranch Suite
- Tubby the Tuba (1945), song, lyrics by Paul Tripp.
- Peewee the Piccolo (1946)
- Jack and Homer the Horse (1946), lyrics by Paul Tripp.
- Further Adventures of Tubby
- Tubby at the Circus
- Little Star of Bethlehem
- Once Upon an Orchestra
- "Pavane for Seskia" harp solo
- Adventures of a Zoo
- Under the Xmas Tree (The Toy Box)
- Pan the Piper (the reed that grew into an orchestra)
- Street Corner Concerto (1946) for harmonica and orchestra
- Brooklyn Baseball Cantata (1937), words by Michael Stratton. Recording released in 1948 by Robert Merrill and RCA Victor. This work was included in some of the U.S. Army's Special Services Division's Blueprint Specials during WWII. It became part of an unsuccessful Broadway musical Of V We Sing, but the cantata's success earned Kleinsinger an honorary membership to the noevlty Society for the Prevention of Disparaging Remarks About Brooklyn.
- Rudolph the Red-Nosed Reindeer (1948), title theme to the film score of the original Max Fleischer film version of the Robert May story.
- Life in the Day of a Secretary, opera
- archy and mehitabel (1954), opera. Libretto by Joe Darion, based on the stories by Don Marquis. Premiered December 1954 by Thomas Scherman and the Little Orchestra Society in New York City.
- Shinbone Alley (1957), Broadway musical
- Johnny Stranger, a concept 78 record by RCA Victor, story and lyrics by Paul Tripp, depicting an American immigrant experience. Narrated and sung by Ray Middleton, played by Russ Case's orchestra.
- Symphony of Winds, for narrator and wind orchestra (1958)
- The Story of Celeste (1959), another collaboration with Paul Tripp along the lines of "Tubby the Tuba" and "Peewee the Piccolo". Released as an LP by Signature Records in 1959 narrated by Victor Jory under an orchestra directed by Ray Bloch.
- The Swallow and the Prince (1959), ballet based on an Oscar Wilde fairytale. Premiered March 1959 in New York City, choreographed by Mattlyn Gavers.
- The Growing-Up Tree, a ballad penned with Joe Darion for Girl Scouts marketing purposes. Originally a television commercial song, it was released as a record.
- The Courtship of Old Joe Clark (1962), song
- Prelude and Sarabande (1963), for accordion. Commissioned by the American Accordionists Association.
- The Inheritance (1964), documentary movie score. Its theme music Pass It On was sung by Pete Seeger, Judy Collins, Tom Paxton, Carla Rotolo, screenwriter Millard Lampell, and others.
- Greece: The Golden Age (1964), television score, for which he was nominated for an Emmy Award.
- Quintet for clarinet and strings, premiered by the Kroll Quartet with Robert McGuiness.
- Ali Baba and the 40 Thieves (1970), music for the Bil Baird puppet show, lyrics by Joe Darion and Bil Baird.
- Squares (1973), score to Doris Chase's computer-generated short film.
- Tune And Workout (Theme and Variations) (1975), a youth introduction to the orchestra.
- The Emperor's New Clothes (1977), score to Doris Chase's film.
- The Silly Book, selected settings from Stoo Hample children's book.
- Cello Concerto, premiered by Paul Olefsky.
- Fantasy for violin and orchestra
- Dance Symphony
- Breughel Suite, designed to be performed along with video projections of Breughel paintings
- Brendan Behan Suite
