= George Pal =

Hungarian-American animator, film director and producer (1908–1980)

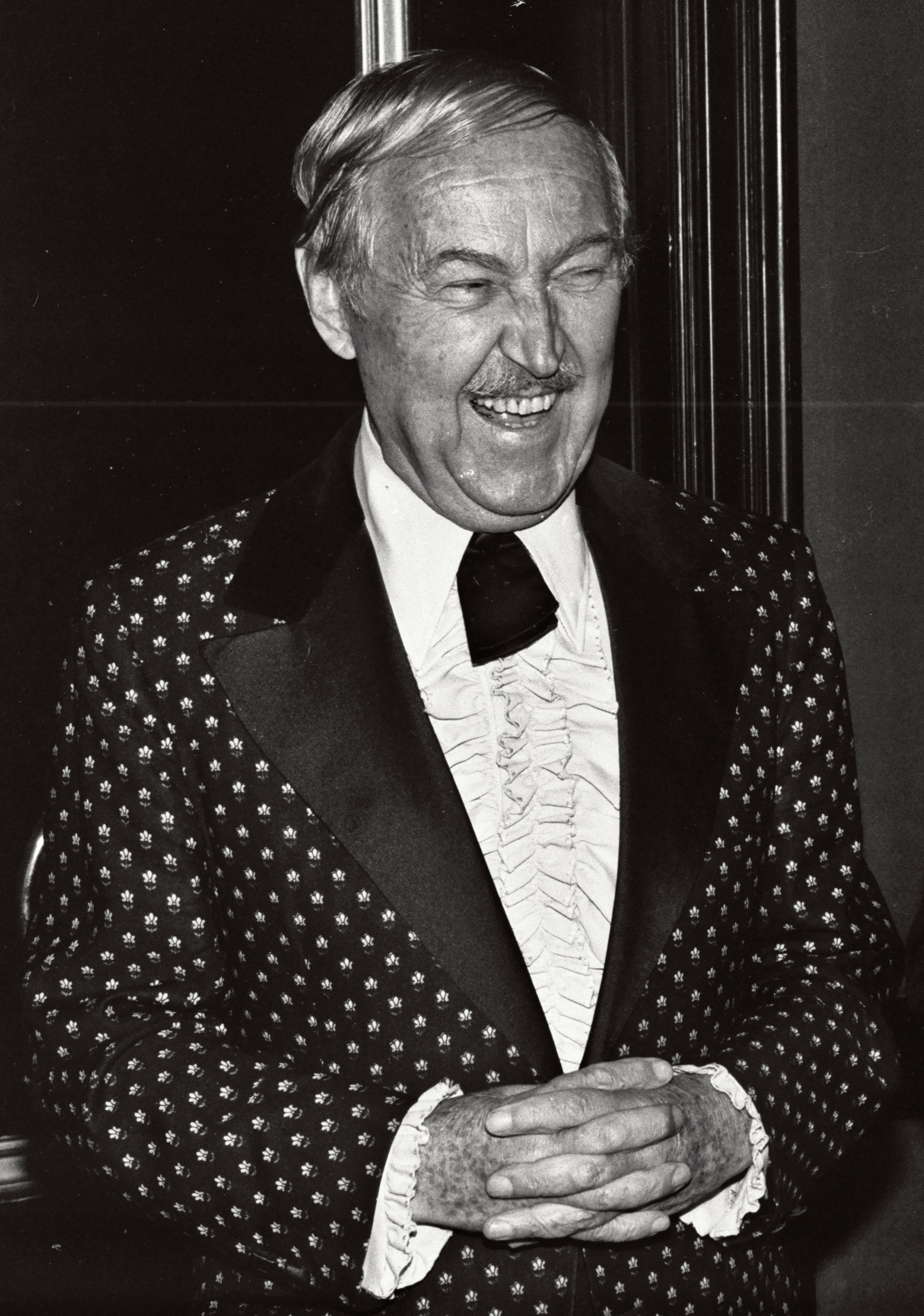
- Pal in 1979
- Born: Gyula György Marczincsak; February 1, 1908; Cegléd, Austria-Hungary
- Died: May 2, 1980 (aged 72); Los Angeles, California, U.S.
- Resting place: Holy Cross Cemetery, Culver City, California
- Other name: György Pál Marczincsak
- Education: Hungarian University of Fine Arts
- Years active: 1931–1975
- Spouse: Elisabeth Grandjean (m.1930)
- Children: 2
- Awards: See Awards and Honors

George Pal (born György Pál Marczincsak, Hungarian: [ˈmɒrt͡sint͡ʃɒk ˈɟørɟ ˈpɑːl]; February 1, 1908 – May 2, 1980) was a Hungarian-American animator, film director and producer. He is known for his stop motion animated film series Puppetoons and his fantasy and science-fiction films. He became an American citizen after emigrating from Europe.

He was nominated for Academy Awards (in the category Best Short Subjects, Cartoon) for seven consecutive years (1942–1948) and received an honorary award in 1944. This makes him the second-most nominated Hungarian exile (together with William S. Darling and Ernest Laszlo) after Miklós Rózsa.

Pal was coauthor with screenwriter Joe Morhaim on the science-fiction novel Time Machine II, published in 1981 as a sequel to The Time Machine by H. G. Wells.

== Early life and career ==
Pal was born in Cegléd, Hungary, as Gyula György Marczincsak the son of Gyula Marczincsak, Sr. and his wife Mária Tikó; in 1936 he officially changed his last name Marczincsak to "Pál", becoming György (George) Pál. He graduated from the Hungarian University of Fine Arts in 1928 (aged 20). From 1928 to 1931, he made films for Hunnia Film Studio of Budapest, Hungary. In 30th June of 1930 in Budapest, he married Elisabeth "Zsóka" Grandjean, and after moving to Berlin, founded Trickfilm-Studio GmbH Pal und Wittke, with UFA Studios as its main customer from 1931 to 1933. During this time, he patented the Pal-Doll technique (known as Puppetoons in the US).

In 1933, he worked in Prague. In 1934, he made cigarette advertisement films in his hotel room in Paris, and was invited by Philips to make two more ad shorts. He started to use Pal-Doll techniques in Eindhoven, in a former butchery, then at villa-studio Suny Home. He made five films before 1939 for the British company Horlicks Malted Milk. In December of that year, aged 32, he emigrated from Europe to the United States, and began work for Paramount Pictures. At this time, his friend Walter Lantz helped him obtain American citizenship.

As an animator, he made the Puppetoons series in the 1940s, which led to him being awarded an honorary Oscar in 1944. Pal then switched to live-action film-making with The Great Rupert (1950).

He is best remembered as the producer of several science-fiction and fantasy films in the 1950s and 1960s, such as When Worlds Collide, four of which were collaborations with director Byron Haskin, including The War of the Worlds (1953). He himself directed Tom Thumb (1958), The Time Machine (1960), and The Wonderful World of the Brothers Grimm (1962).

== Death ==
In May 1980, he died in Beverly Hills, California, of a heart attack at the age of 72, and is buried in Holy Cross Cemetery, Culver City, California. The Voyage of the Berg, on which he was working at the time, was never completed.

== Awards and honors ==
Pal has a star on the Hollywood Walk of Fame at 1722 Vine St. In 1980, the Academy of Motion Picture Arts and Sciences founded the "George Pal Lecture on Fantasy in Film" series in his memory.

Pal was given a Special Academy Award at the 16th Academy Awards ceremony in 1944 for his stop-motion animation with "the development of novel methods and techniques in the production of short subjects known as Puppetoons". During the 1940s, seven of his Puppetoons films were nominated for Academy Awards in the category Short Subjects (Cartoons): Rhythm in the Ranks (1941), Tulips Shall Grow (1942), The 500 Hats of Bartholomew Cubbins (1943), And To Think I Saw it On Mulberry Street (1944), Jasper and the Beanstalk (1945), John Henry and the Inky-Poo (1946) and Tubby the Tuba (1947).

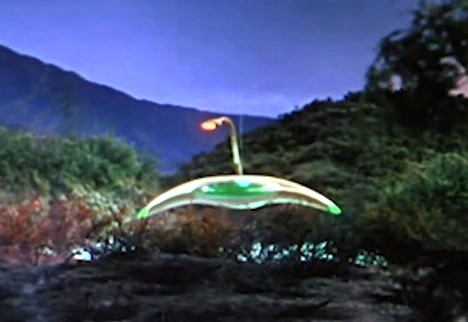
Martian fighting machine from Pal's The War of the Worlds, which won the Oscar for Best Special Effects for 1953

A number of the feature films produced by Pal were nominated for Academy Awards in the categories Best Special Effects, Best Art Direction, Best Cinematography, Best Sound Recording, and Best Costume Design. Destination Moon (1950), When Worlds Collide (1951), The War of the Worlds (1953), Tom Thumb (1958), and The Time Machine (1960) won the Oscar for Best Special Effects; The Wonderful World of the Brothers Grimm (1962) won for Best Costume Design. Pal's 7 Faces of Dr. Lao (1964) received an Honorary Academy Award for outstanding make-up achievement by William Tuttle.

George Pal (along with the film When Worlds Collide) is among the many references to classic science fiction and horror films in the opening theme ("Science Fiction/Double Feature") of both the stage musical The Rocky Horror Show and its cinematic counterpart, The Rocky Horror Picture Show (1975).

In 1975, Pal received the Golden Plate Award of the American Academy of Achievement, as well as the San Diego Comic Con Inkpot Award. The Academy of Science Fiction, Fantasy and Horror Films established the George Pal Memorial Award, first awarded in 1975, for outstanding work in the three genres.

In 1976, the International Animated Film Association gave Pal the Winsor McCay Award for career contributions to the art of animation at the 5th Annie Awards.

Pal's Puppetoons Tulips Shall Grow (1942) and John Henry and the Inky-Poo (1946) were added to the Library of Congress 1997 and 2015 National Film Registry, which selects films for preservation that are considered "culturally, historically, or aesthetically significant". Pal's science fiction feature film The War of the Worlds (1953) was added to the National Film Registry in 2011.

Pál crater on Mars (79 km/49 mi across), named in honor of George Pal. Photo by Mars Reconnaissance Orbiter

In 2010, the International Astronomical Union named Pál crater on Mars in his honor.

George Pal was inducted into the New Mexico Museum of Space History International Space Hall of Fame in 2015. Film historian Justin Humphreys accepted the award on behalf of Pal.

The Visual Effects Society inducted George Pal into the VES Hall of Fame in 2022 for his important contributions to the field of visual effects.

George Pal's life, career, and influence have been documented and reviewed in the books The Films of George Pal by Gail Morgan Hickman, featuring interviews with the filmmaker, published in 1977, and the authorized biography George Pal: Man of Tomorrow by film historian Justin Humphreys, published in 2023. Arnold Leibovit produced and directed the documentary The Fantasy Film Worlds of George Pal, released in 1985.

== Preservation ==
The Academy Film Archive has preserved several of George Pal's films, including Radio Röhren (Valve) Revolution (1934), an advertising short for Philips, Jasper and the Beanstalk (1945), and John Henry and the Inky Poo (1946).

During his lifetime, Pal reportedly gave away many of the original Puppetoon puppets as gifts. Much of his personal collection of artwork, puppets, props, models, and other artifacts from his films was destroyed in the November 1961 Bel Air Fire disaster in Los Angeles when his home burned to the ground. In 1983, his widow Elisabeth Pal donated some of the remaining Puppetoon objects to the Smithsonian Institution for the National Museum of American History, including one of the Tubby the Tuba models along with a frog and three string instruments from the 1947 short film.

== Filmography ==
=== Live-action feature films ===
| Year | Title | Director | Producer | Ref(s) |
|---|---|---|---|---|
| 1950 | The Great Rupert | | Yes | |
| 1950 | Destination Moon | | Yes | |
| 1951 | When Worlds Collide | | Yes | |
| 1953 | Houdini | | Yes | |
| 1953 | The War of the Worlds | | Yes | |
| 1954 | The Naked Jungle | | Yes | |
| 1955 | Conquest of Space | | Yes | |
| 1958 | Tom Thumb | Yes | Yes | |
| 1960 | The Time Machine | Yes | Yes | |
| 1961 | Atlantis, the Lost Continent | Yes | Yes | |
| 1962 | The Wonderful World of the Brothers Grimm | Yes | Yes | |
| 1964 | 7 Faces of Dr. Lao | Yes | Yes | |
| 1968 | The Power | | Yes | |
| 1975 | Doc Savage: The Man of Bronze | | Yes | |

== Unreleased, unfinished, or projected films ==
- Gulliver's Travels (1935)
- Sinbad (1935)
- Three Little Princes (1935)
- Casey Jones (1945)
- Davy Crockett (1945)
- Johnny Appleseed (1946)
- After Worlds Collide (1955)
- Odd John (1967) (rights acquired only)
- Logan's Run (1968)
- When the Sleeper Wakes (1972)
- War of the Worlds (1974–75) Unfinished TV pilot
- Doc Savage: The Arch Enemy of Evil (1976)
- The Time Traveller (1977–78) aka Time Machine II. A novelization with Joe Morhaim was published posthumously in 1981.
- The Wonderful Wizard of Oz (1979)
- The Disappearance (1980) (only in preproduction)
- Voyage of the Berg (1980) (only in preproduction)

== Posthumous collection ==
- The Fantasy Film Worlds of George Pal (1985) (Produced and directed by Arnold Leibovit)
- The Puppetoon Movie (1987) (Produced and directed by Arnold Leibovit)
- The Puppetoon Movie Volume 2 (2020) (Produced and directed by Arnold Leibovit)
- The Puppetoon Movie Volume 3 (2023) (Produced and directed by Arnold Leibovit)

== Bibliography ==
- Gail Morgan Hickman. The Films of George Pal. South Brunswick, NJ: A.S. Barnes & Co., 1977. ISBN 0-498-01960-8.
- Schepp, Ole and Kamphuis, Fred. George Pal in Holland 1934–1939. Den Haag: Kleinoffsetdrukkerij Kapsenberg, 1983.
- Miller, Thomas Kent. Mars in the Movies: A History. Jefferson, North Carolina: McFarland & Company, 2016. ISBN 978-0-7864-9914-4.
- Peters, Mette. "George Pal’s ‘Cavalcade of Colours, Music and Dolls’: 1930s Advertising Films in Transnational Contexts". In: Animation and Advertising. Thompson, Kirsten Moana, Cook, Malcolm (Eds.). Palgrave Macmillan, 2019. ISBN 978-3-030-27938-7.
- Justin Humphreys. George Pal: Man of Tomorrow. Albany, GA: BearManor Media, 2023. ISBN 979-8-8877-1042-6
