= List of fictional cyborgs =

This list is for fictional cyborgs.

== Literature ==
=== Before 1920 ===
- Edward Sydney from Samuel-Henri Berthoud's story "Prestige" (1831).
- John A. B. C. Smith from Edgar Allan Poe's story "The Man That Was Used Up" (1839).
- Baron Savitch from Edward Page Mitchell's story "The Ablest Man in the World" (1879).
- Tin Woodman in the L. Frank Baum's novel The Wonderful Wizard of Oz (1900).
- "The captain" in the André Couvreur's novel Caresco surhomme [Caresco, Superman] (1904).
- The Supermen from Gaston de Pawlowski's novel Voyage au pays de la quatrième dimension [Journey to the Land of the Fourth Dimension] (1909).
- Number 241 from the 1917 play Efficiency, by Robert Hobart Davis and Perley Poore Sheehan.
- Lawrence Merly from Alex Pasquier's story "Le secret de ne jamais mourir" [The secret of never dying] (1919).

=== 1920s ===
- Jean Lebris from Maurice Renard's novel L'Homme truqué [The Doctored Man] (1921).
- The Clockwork man from a novel of same name written by E.V. Odle in 1923.
- Gabriel, real name Benedict Masson, from Gaston Leroux's novel La Poupée sanglante [The Bloody Doll] (1923).
- The Ardathian from Francis Flagg's story "The Machine Man of Ardathia" (1927).
- Hanley and the comet-people from Edmond Hamilton's story "The Comet Doom" (1928).
- George Gregory from Clare Winger Harris's story "The Artificial Man" (1929).

=== 1930s ===
- The Mi-go aliens from H. P. Lovecraft's novella The Whisperer in Darkness (1931).
- Professor Jameson and the Zoromes from Neil R. Jones's story "The Jameson Satellite" (1931).
- Nez Hulan from Neil R. Jones's story "The Asteroid of Death" (1931).
- Nyctalope in the Jean de La Hire's novel L'Assassinat du Nyctalope [The Assassination of the Nyctalope] (1933).

=== 1940s ===
- Simon Wright, from Captain Future stories (1940–1946), written by Edmond Hamilton.
- Deirdre from C. L. Moore's short story "No Woman Born" (1944).
- Bart Quentin from Henry Kuttner's short story "Camouflage" (1945).

=== 1950s ===
- Habermans and Scanners from Cordwainer Smith's story "Scanners Live in Vain" (1950).
- The Immobs from Bernard Wolfe's novel Limbo (1952).
- Lucas Martino from Algis Budrys's novel Who? (1958).
- Dr. Julius No from a novel of same name written by Ian Fleming in 1958.

=== 1960s ===
- Helva and the shell people from Anne McCaffrey's story "The Ship Who Sang" (1961).
- The Cyborgs from Frank Herbert's novel The Eyes of Heisenberg (1966).
- Jim from Damon Knight's story "Masks" (1968).

=== 1970s ===
- Howard Falcon from Arthur C. Clarke's novella A Meeting with Medusa (1971).
- Harry Benson from Michael Crichton's novel The Terminal Man (1972).
- Steve Austin from Martin Caidin's novel Cyborg (1972).
- P. Burke (Philadelphia Burke) from James Tiptree Jr.'s novella The Girl Who Was Plugged In (1973).
- The Sauron Supermen from the novel The Mote in God's Eye, written by Larry Niven and Jerry Pournelle in 1974.
- Roger Torraway from Frederik Pohl's novel Man Plus (1976).

=== 1980s ===
- Jonas from Gene Wolfe's novel series Book of the New Sun (1980–1983).
- Molly Millions from William Gibson's Sprawl trilogy (1984–1988).
- The Comprise, a computer-mediated hive mind which has taken over Earth, in the novel Vacuum Flowers (1987) by Michael Swanwick.
- Linda Nagy, a.k.a. Ellen Troy, from the novel series Venus Prime (1987–1991), written by Arthur C. Clarke and Paul Preuss.
- Shrike from Dan Simmons's novel series Hyperion Cantos (1989–1997).

=== 1990s ===
- Jessamyn Bonney from Kim Newman's novel Demon Download (1990).
- Xris Cyborg from Margaret Weis's Star of the Guardians series (1990–1998).
- Angus Thermopyle from Stephen R. Donaldson's The Gap Cycle (1991–1996).
- Yod from Marge Piercy's novel He, She and It (1991).
- Rat Things from Neal Stephenson's Snow Crash (1992).
- In William C. Dietz's Legion of the Damned (1993) the Legion is made up of a combination of humans and heavily armed cyborgs (human brains in mecha forms).
- Buck Rogers in the Martin Caidin's novel Buck Rogers: A Life in the Future (1995).
- Jagernauts from Catherine Asaro's Saga of the Skolian Empire (1995-).
- Hannes Suessi from David Brin's Uplift novels is transformed into a cyborg by the time he re-appears in Infinity's Shore (1996).
- Mendoza from Kage Baker's novel In the Garden of Iden (1997).

=== 2000s ===
- Takeshi Kovacs from Richard Morgan's Altered Carbon (2002).

=== 2010s ===
- Linh Cinder from Marissa Meyer's The Lunar Chronicles (2012–2015).
- The Murderbot from Martha Wells's The Murderbot Diaries (2017-).

== Comics and manga ==
=== 1940s ===
- Robotman from DC Comics (1942)

=== 1950s ===
- Metallo from DC Comics (1959)

=== 1960s ===
- Robotman from DC Comics (1963)
- The Brain from DC Comics (1964)
- Cyborgs 001, 002, 003, 004, 005, 006, 007, 008, and 009 from Cyborg 009 (1964)

=== 1970s ===
- Deathlok from Marvel Comics (1974)
- Rocket Raccoon and other Halfworlders from Marvel Comics (1976)
- Rom and other Spaceknights from Marvel Comics (1979)
- Beilert Valance from Marvel Comics (1978)

=== 1980s ===
- Cyborg from DC Comics (1980)
- Tetsuo Shima from Akira (1982)
- Fugitoid from Teenage Mutant Ninja Turtles (1984)
- Briareos Hecatonchires from Appleseed (1985)
- Lady Deathstrike from Marvel Comics (1986)
- Nuke from Marvel Comics (1986)
- C17, C18, Dr. Gero/C20, from Dragon Ball Z (1989)
- Coldblood from Marvel Comics (1989)
- Motoko Kusanagi from Ghost in the Shell (1989)
- Rudol von Stroheim from Battle Tendency (1988)

=== 1990s ===
- Baxter Stockman from Teenage Mutant Ninja Turtles
- Cable from Marvel Comics (1990)
- Heatwave from Cyber Force (1992)
- Cy-Gor from Spawn (1993)
- The Dark Legion introduced in Archie Comics' Knuckles the Echidna comic series and featured in Sonic the Hedgehog and Sonic Universe, and its Dark Egg Legion expansion.
- Omega Red from Marvel Comics
- Overtkill from Spawn (1993)
- Alita from the Gunnm/Gunnm:Last Order
- Inspector Steel(1995) from Raj Comics
- Toadborg from Bucky O'Hare and the Toad Wars
- Tremor from Spawn (1994)
- Curse from Spawn (1995)
- Alexander Anderson from Hellsing (1997)
- Verminator X from Teenage Mutant Ninja Turtles Adventures

=== 2000s ===
- Edward Elric from Fullmetal Alchemist
- Franky from One Piece
- Bucky Barnes from Marvel Comics
- Jack Marlin from Tales of the Teenage Mutant Ninja Turtles
- Donald Ferguson from Image Comics
- The Major and Heinkel Wolfe from Hellsing
- Bartholomew Kuma from One Piece
- Kimiko Ross from Dresden Codak

=== 2010s ===
- The Egg Army featured in Archie Comics' Sonic the Hedgehog properties, replacing the Dark Legion and Dark Egg Legion following a continuity reboot.
- Genos from One-Punch Man.
- Katie Cooper – Cyborg Studies
- Sy Borgman from DC Comics

== Film ==
=== Before 1950 ===
- "Q" - The Automaton from the serial The Master Mystery (1918)
- C. A. Rotwang from Fritz Lang's Metropolis (1927)
- John Ellman from The Walking Dead (1936)

=== 1950s ===
- W. H. Donovan from Donovan's Brain (1953)
- Dr. Knupp from The Robot vs. the Aztec Mummy (1958)
- Jerry Spensser from The Colossus of New York (1958)

=== 1960s ===
- Jan Compton from The Brain That Wouldn't Die (1962)
- Dr. Julius No from James Bond film Dr. No (1962)
- Garth and the two Tracers from the future, from the film Cyborg 2087 (1966)

=== 1970s ===
- Gigan from the Godzilla franchise
- Katsura Mafune from Terror of Mechagodzilla (1975)
- Anakin Skywalker/Darth Vader from the Star Wars series (1977)

=== 1980s ===
- Luke Skywalker from the Star Wars series (1980)
- Vera Webster from Superman III (1983)
- Overdog from Spacehunter: Adventures in the Forbidden Zone (1983)
- Max Renn from Videodrome (1983)
- Tommy from Exterminators of the Year 3000 (1984)
- T-800 from the film The Terminator (1984)
- Mandroid from Eliminators (1986)
- Paco Queruak from Vendetta dal futuro (1986)
- Carl / The Vindicator from The Vindicator (1986)
- Samantha Pringle / BB from Deadly Friend (1986)
- Mr Igoe from Innerspace (1987)
- Alex Murphy / RoboCop from the RoboCop series
- Pearl Prophet from Cyborg (1989)
- Griff Tannen (Biff Tannen's grandson) and his gang from Back to the Future Part II (1989)
- Dan Jordan in A Nightmare on Elm Street 5: The Dream Child (1989)
- Metal Fetishist from Tetsuo: The Iron Man (1989)

=== 1990s ===
- Circuitry Man from Circuitry Man (1990)
- Phillip from Cyborg Cop (1993)
- RoboCop 2 and Cain from the RoboCop series
- Austin from American Cyborg: Steel Warrior
- Borg Queen from Star Trek: First Contact
- Casella "Cash" Reese from Cyborg 2 and Cyborg 3
- Cyborg Mark in Hong Kong Stephen Chow's comedy Sixty Million Dollar Man
- Elgar in Turbo: A Power Rangers Movie
- John Brown/Inspector Gadget from Inspector Gadget (1999)
- Sanford Scolex/Dr. Claw from Inspector Gadget (1999)
- Lt. Parker Barnes from the film Virtuosity (1995)
- T-800 from Terminator 2: Judgment Day (1991)
- Casshan in Casshan: Robot Hunter (1993–94)
- Batou from Ghost in the Shell (1995)
- Dr. Arlis Loveless from Wild Wild West (1999)
- Several characters from Virus (1999)

=== 2000s ===
- Tima from Metropolis (2001)
- John Silver from Treasure Planet (2002)
- Jason Voorhees from Jason X (2002)
- Kiryu, an iteration of Mechagodzilla from Godzilla Against Mechagodzilla and Godzilla: Tokyo S.O.S. (2002–2003)
- T-850 and the T-X from Terminator 3: Rise of the Machines (2003)
- Roboduff from Kim Possible: A Sitch in Time (2003)
- Del Spooner from I, Robot (2004)
- Frankenstein from Van Helsing (2004)
- General Grievous from Star Wars: Episode III – Revenge of the Sith (2005)
- Brian Kadeem/Drone Kadeem from Hot Wheels: AcceleRacers (2005)
- Isaac from Cyborg Soldier (2008)
- Marcus Wright from Terminator Salvation (2009)

=== 2010s ===
- Frankenstein from Death Race 2050
- Lynette Guycott from Scott Pilgrim
- Platyborg, an alternate version of Perry the Platypus from Phineas and Ferb the Movie: Across the 2nd Dimension
- Max Da Costa from Elysium (2013)
- Metalbeard, a robotic pirate and a Master Builder in The Lego Movie (2014)
- Ava from The Machine (2013)
- Alex Murphy from RoboCop (2014)
- Charles "Charlie" Hesketh, from Kingsman: The Golden Circle (2017)
- Obsidian Fury from Pacific Rim Uprising (2018)
- Alita, who is suffering from amnesia and is guided by cyborg scientist Dr. Dyson Ido to learn about her destiny, while fighting alongside or against other Hunter-Warriors in Alita: Battle Angel (2019)
- Brixton Lore from Hobbs & Shaw (2019)
- Grace from Terminator: Dark Fate (2019)
- Killian from Spies in Disguise (2019)
- April from the Sharknado (film series)
- Thor from the Marvel Cinematic Universe

=== 2020's ===
- Cyborg Spider-Woman in Spider-Man: Across the Spider-Verse (2023)

== Television series ==
=== 1960s ===
- Daleks from the Doctor Who series (1963)
- Cybermen from the Doctor Who series (1966)
- Batfink from Batfink (1966)

=== 1970s ===
- Steve Austin from The Six Million Dollar Man (1974)
- Jaime Sommers from The Bionic Woman (1976)
- Dynomutt, Dog Wonder from Scooby-Doo & Dynomutt Hour (1976)
- Count Blocken from Mazinger Z (1972)
- Casshan from Casshan (1973)
- Takeshi Hongo/Kamen Rider #1 and Hayato Ichimonji/Kamen Rider #2 from Kamen Rider (1971)

=== 1980s ===
- The Borg from the Star Trek series
- Doc Terror from Centurions
- Inspector Gadget from Inspector Gadget (1983)
- Krang from Teenage Mutant Ninja Turtles
- Hacker from Centurions
- Trap-Jaw from He-Man and the Masters of the Universe
- Jiban from Kidou Keiji Jiban
- Quintessons from Transformers
- Man-E-Faces from He-Man and the Masters of the Universe
- X-Ray from Rambo: The Force of Freedom
- The SilverHawks from SilverHawks (1986)
- Shinya Takeda from Dennou Keisatsu Cybercop (1988)
- Thirty/Thirty, a cyborg horse from BraveStarr (1987)
- 'C17 , C18 , C20, da Dragon Ball Z (1989)

=== 1990s ===
- Locutus of Borg (Jean-Luc Picard) - 2 part episode The Best of Both Worlds (Star Trek: The Next Generation) (1990)
- Astronema from Power Rangers in Space
- Gadget Boy from Gadget Boy & Heather
- Haxx from Extreme Dinosaurs
- Taurus Bulba from Darkwing Duck (1991)
- Mr. Freeze from The New Batman Adventures
- Richard Nixon from Futurama (1999)
- Bunnie Rabbot from Sonic the Hedgehog
- Seven of Nine from Star Trek: Voyager
- Jet Black from Cowboy Bebop
- The various Evangelion units from Neon Genesis Evangelion have the appearance of humanoid mechas but are actually cyborgs.
- Toadborg from Bucky O'Hare and the Toad Wars
- Mukuro from YuYu Hakusho is a demon with robotic parts.
- Steerminator from Darkwing Duck
- Targetman from Doug
- Various unis in Swat Kats

=== 2000s ===
- Adam from Buffy the Vampire Slayer (2000)
- Alan Gabriel from The Big O (2002)
- Avery Bullock from American Dad!
- Bob Oblong from The Oblongs (2001)
- Bizarro Debbie and Bizarro Marco from Sealab 2021 (2002)
- Brother Blood from Teen Titans (2005)
- Dillon, Tenaya 7, and others from Power Rangers RPM (2009)
- Gemini from Kim Possible
- Macker, the Safecracker from Totally Spies! (2001)
- Mechanikat from Krypto the Superdog (2005)
- Agent Z from Buzz Lightyear of Star Command (2000)
- Emperor Zurg from Buzz Lightyear of Star Command (2000)
- General Grievous from Star Wars: Clone Wars (2003)
- Hannibal McFist from Randy Cunningham: 9th Grade Ninja
- Henrietta, Triela, Rico, Claes, Angelica, Elsa de Sica, and Elizaveta from Gunslinger Girl
- Heloise from Jimmy Two-Shoes
- Jeremiah Gottwald from Code Geass
- Jonas Venture Junior from The Venture Bros.
- Kraab from Ben 10
- Master Billy Quizboy from The Venture Bros.
- Bannakaffalatta from Doctor Who
- Max Capricorn from Doctor Who
- Morticon from Power Rangers Mystic Force
- Jaime Sommers from the 2007 re-imagining of Bionic Woman.
- Cameron Phillips and the T-888 in Terminator: The Sarah Connor Chronicles.
- Blackarachnia from Transformers: Animated
- Manny Armstrong from Ben 10
- Gatling from World of Quest
- Grooor from Ōban Star-Racers
- RoboCable from RoboCop: Prime Directives
- Pickles from Futurama
- Sebastian Saga from Totally Spies!
- Skulker and Nicolai Technus from Danny Phantom
- S.O.P.H.I.E, Power Rangers S.P.D.
- Mad March, an undead cyborg assassin from Alice
- Dr. X from Action Man
- Cyborg Alpha (Kaitou), Beta (Harry), Gamma (Ray), Delta (Hizuru Asuka) and Epsilon (Shun Kazami) from Towa no Quon.
- Kiera Cameron from Continuum (2012–present)
- WinoBot from Wonder Showzen

=== 2010s ===
- Adam Davenport from Lab Rats
- Lieutenant Commander Airiam from Star Trek: Discovery
- Badgerclops from Mao Mao: Heroes of Pure Heart
- Baron Von Steamer from Big Hero 6: The Series
- Barry Dylan from Archer
- Belly Bag and Tiny Miracle from Uncle Grandpa
- Commander Forge Ferrus from Max Steel (2013–2016)
- Conway Stern from Archer
- Crocubot from The Vindicators
- Bob from Lab Rats: Bionic Island
- Bree Davenport from Lab Rats
- Black Heron from DuckTales
- Blitz Borgs from NFL Rush Zone: Guardians Unleashed
- Brixton Lore from Hobbs & Shaw
- Carol and Red Action from OK K.O.! Let's Be Heroes
- Chase Davenport from Lab Rats
- Colonel Leland Bishop/Silas/C.I.L.A.S. from Transformers Prime, a human connected to a deceased Decepticon body.
- The Cybergs from Teenage Mutant Ninja Turtles
- Cyborg Raccoon from Robot Chicken
- Daniel from Lab Rats: Bionic Island
- Darrell and Shannon from OK K.O.! Let's Be Heroes
- Darth Maul from Star Wars: The Clone Wars, who is shown to have survived his apparent demise at the end of Star Wars: Episode I – The Phantom Menace and is shown with multiple sets of mechanical legs.
- Delaney Pilar from Pandora
- Della Duck from DuckTales
- Dutch from Archer
- Ernesto from OK K.O.! Let's Be Heroes
- Evil Cyborg Julian from Randy Cunningham: 9th Grade Ninja
- Finn the Human from Adventure Time
- Future Perry the Platypus from Phineas and Ferb
- Gary Goodspeed from Final Space
- General Rubbish from Major Lazer
- Genos from One-Punch Man
- Hannibal McFist from Randy Cunningham: 9th Grade Ninja
- Iron Baron from Masters of Spinjitzu
- The Iron Terror from Speed Racer: The Next Generation
- Liborg from Axe Cop
- James Ironwood from RWBY
- Jethro from OK K.O.! Let's Be Heroes
- John Kennex from Almost Human
- Kate from Lab Rats: Bionic Island
- Katya Kazanova from Archer
- Leo Dooley from Lab Rats
- Lord Boxman, Professor Venomous and Fink from OK K.O.! Let's Be Heroes
- Maahox from Voltron Force
- Mercury Black from RWBY
- Major Lazer from Major Lazer
- Manchine from Kroll Show
- The Mechanic from Ninjago
- Megahertz from Mighty Med
- Mikayla from OK K.O.! Let's Be Heroes
- Obsidian Fury from Pacific Rim: Uprising
- Pickles from Futurama
- Phoenixperson from Rick and Morty
- Professor Paradox from Ben 10: Omniverse
- Ray Gillette from Archer
- Raymond from OK K.O.! Let's Be Heroes
- Robo Dino from SuperMansion
- Robo-Stache from Bob's Burgers
- Robot from Lost in Space (2018)
- S-1 from Lab Rats
- Sebastian from Lab Rats
- Sevika from Arcane
- Shiro from Voltron: Legendary Defender
- Spin from Lab Rats
- Tiger Claw from Teenage Mutant Ninja Turtles (2012)
- Techmo from Regular Show
- Tiffany from Adventure Time
- Wells 2.0 from The Flash
- Wallow from Bravest Warriors
- Yang Xiao Long from RWBY
- Vandata from The Venture Bros.
- Verminator Rex from Teenage Mutant Ninja Turtles (2012)
- Victor Krane from Lab Rats
- Violet Evergarden from Violet Evergarden
- Vrak from Power Rangers Megaforce
- Zetsuborg from "Go! Princess Pretty Cure"

=== 2020s ===
- Captain Dolph Laserhawk and Warden Sarah Fisher from Captain Laserhawk: A Blood Dragon Remix (2023)
- Kashima from Sakamoto Days (2025)
- Murderbot, based on the Murderbot Diares books by Martha Wells (Tv Show: 2025) (Books: 2017 - Present)
- Morrow, the USCSS Maginot 's cyborg security officer in the FX on Hulu TV series Alien: Earth (2025).
- Towasa Ōmaki Towasa no Yuugure (2025).--

== Video games ==
- Adam Jensen, Anna Navarre, Gunther Herrman, Jaron Namir, Lawrence Barrett, Yelena Fedorova, and several other characters in Deus Ex and its prequel, Deus Ex: Human Revolution, are augmented with cybernetics.
- Amber Torrelson, one of the four player characters in Project Eden, is a cyborg Urban Protection Agent; her body has been rebuilt within a giant robotic frame after sustaining fatal injuries in a train accident.
- Barret Wallace from Final Fantasy VII
- Berle, Ruprecht, Shigeo, and Vesper of the Ten Wise Men from Star Ocean: The Second Story.
- Biological Engineering Project 154, the protagonist of the Thing Thing series.
- Boothill from Honkai: Star Rail
- Brad Fang from Contra: Hard Corps
- Bryan Fury from the Tekken series
- Cap'n Hands and F.U.B. from Loaded
- Captain Tobias Bruckner from Turok: Evolution
- CATS, the main antagonist from the game Zero Wing
- The Combine from Half-Life 2 base the core of their fighting forces on synths, cyborgs made from members of various previously enslaved species. Whenever they subjugate a world, the dominant species of the planet is turned into cyborgs, giving the Combine an army that can be deployed in any kind of planetary environment; the most prominent ones seen are Dropships, Gunships, Striders and Hunters. With Earth as their newest acquisition, an unknown number of humans (mainly dissidents and Civil Protection volunteers) have been cybernetically enhanced into Overwatch Soldiers. Dissidents unsuitable for conversion are instead turned into Stalkers, heavily dismembered torsos with crude metallic limb replacements. Overwatch Elites are implied to have received more augmentations than ordinary Soldiers and various content cut from the game's final version includes even more radical designs such as humans fused into bulky, biomechanical powered armor.
- Commander Shepard, the protagonist of Mass Effect, is extensively implanted with cybernetics in an effort to bring him/her (Shepard's gender is chosen by the player; as such, there is no canon gender) back from the dead.
- Experimental Cyber Soldier Program, or Direct Neural Interface, which may cause the death of the test subjects, from Call of Duty: Black Ops III.
- Cyberdemon, a boss in the Doom game franchise
- Cyborg, Cyborg Reaper and Cyborg Commando, cyborg soldiers developed by Brotherhood of Nod in Command and Conquer 2 and its expansion pack Firestorm, who later went rogue with the renegade Nod AI CABAL (Computer Assisted Biologically Augmented Lifeform) to fulfill its world domination. All of these cyborgs are superior to their human counterparts, and the strongest of them, the Cyborg Commando, can even defeat a Mammoth Mk.2 superheavy walker in a one-on-one showdown.
- Cyborg infantry from Command and Conquer 3: Kane's Wrath, utilized by Nod subfaction Marked of Kane, which, led by CABAL's reincarnation LEGION, bears a striking resemblance to CABAL's army in the previous war. The Awakened serve as Marked of Kane's basic infantry, Tiberium troopers as close range anti-infantry/anti-structure support, and Enlightened as elite anti-ground troopers.
- Doctor N. Gin from the Crash Bandicoot series
- Deadeye Joe from Contra Hard Corps
- Dr. Crygor from the WarioWare, Inc. series
- Dr. Raoul from Master X Master
- ECO 35-2 from Rise of the Robots
- Fulgore from the Killer Instinct series
- Gar'Skuther, the villain of Spore Creatures
- Genji, an advanced cyborg ninja who appears as a playable character in Overwatch and Heroes of the Storm.
- Gray Fox and Raiden from the Metal Gear Solid series
- The Grox are a race of cyborg carnivores creatures, that rule most of the Galaxy in Spore, and the main antagonists.
- Hung Lo, Lo Wang's evil brother from Shadow Warrior: Twin Dragon
- Iji, the titular character from the indie game Iji.
- Jake, from Night Slashers
- Cyrax, Sektor, Smoke, and Cyber Sub-Zero from the Mortal Kombat series
- Lopers from Return to Castle Wolfenstein
- The Marathon Trilogy's protagonist
- Martha, and M. Blaster from The Combatribes
- The Masked Man from Mother 3
- Matthew Kane from Quake 4
- Maxima, a character from The King of Fighters series.
- Nathan Spencer From the Bionic Commando series
- Necrons, a race from the Warhammer 40,000 universe, are led by what seem to be intelligent machine organisms. The Obliterators of the Chaos faction fuse their weapons and armor directly into their flesh.
- Nikkes from NIKKE: Goddess of Victory
- Plant Contra from Neo Contra
- R.A.X. Coswell, a kickboxing cyborg from Eternal Champions and Eternal Champions: Challenge from the Dark Side
- Revenant from Apex Legends
- Rex, a cybordog from Fallout: New Vegas
- Right Hand Man Reborn from the Henry Stickmin Collection was equipped with cybernetics after being defeated by Henry Stickmin in order to bring him back to life.
- Sergeant Rex "Power" Colt, the protagonist from Far Cry 3: Blood Dragon
- Cyber Shredder from Teenage Mutant Ninja Turtles III: Radical Rescue
- Spartans from the Halo series receive extensive physical augmentations, including ceramic plated bones in order to resist the stresses of using their MJOLNIR powered armor that can lethally injure unaugmented humans with a wrong move.
- The Strogg from the Quake series are a warlike cybernetic race. The Strogg systematically replace their ranks with prisoners of war, "stroggified" and assimilated through the modification of their bodies with mechanical weaponry and prosthetics. The games Quake II (1997) and Quake 4 (2005) feature Strogg cyborg enemies in many shapes and variations.
- Steve Hermann from Shatterhand
- Super Soldiers from Return to Castle Wolfenstein
- Symbionts from Supreme Commander
- Many of the enemies, along with the protagonist from System Shock and its sequel, System Shock 2.
- Xiangli Yao from Wuthering Waves.
- Yoshimitsu from the Tekken and Soulcalibur series.
- Vanessa Z. Schneider from P.N.03, who wears cybernetic suits that connect to her spine and central nervous system to enable her to shoot blasts of energy from her body and palms.

== See also ==
- List of fictional robots and androids
- List of fictional gynoids
- Science fiction
