= The Mathematical Magpie =

Book by Clifton Fadiman

- First edition
- Author: Clifton Fadiman
- Language: English
- Genre: Anthology
- Publisher: Simon & Schuster
- Publication date: 1962
- Publication place: United States
- Media type: Print (Hardcover and Paperback)
- Pages: 303

The Mathematical Magpie is an anthology published in 1962, compiled by Clifton Fadiman as a companion volume to his Fantasia Mathematica (1958). The volume contains stories, cartoons, essays, rhymes, music, anecdotes, aphorisms, and other oddments. Authors include Arthur C. Clarke, Isaac Asimov, Mark Twain, Lewis Carroll, and many other renowned figures. A revised edition was issued in 1981 and again in 1997. Although out of print, it is recommended for undergraduate mathematics libraries by the Mathematical Association of America as part of their Basic Library List.

== Contents ==
- "Cartoon" by Abner Dean
- "Introduction" by Clifton Fadiman

=== A Set of Imaginaries ===
- "Cartoon" by Alan Dunn
- "The Feeling of Power" by Isaac Asimov
- "The Law" by Robert M. Coates
- "The Appendix and the Spectacles" by Miles J. Breuer, MD
- "Paul Bunyan Versus the Conveyor Belt" by William Hazlett Upson
- "The Pacifist" by Arthur C. Clarke
- "The Hermeneutical Doughnut" by H. Nearing Jr.
- "Star, Bright" by Mark Clifton
- "'FYI"' by James Blish
- "The Vanishing Man" by Richard Hughes
- "The Nine Billion Names of God" by Arthur C. Clarke

=== Comic Sections ===
- "Three Mathematical Diversions" by Raymond Queneau
- "The Wonderful World of Figures" by Corey Ford
- "A B and C – the Human Element in Mathematics" by Stephen Leacock
- "Cartoon" by Johnny Hart
- "A Note on the Einstein Theory by" Max Beerbohm
- "The Achievement of HT Wensel" by H. Allen Smith
- "Needed: Feminine Math" by Parke Cummings
- "Cartoon" by Alfred Frueh
- "Two Extracts" by Mark Twain
- "Mathematics for Golfers" by Stephen Leacock
- "The Mathematician's Nightmare: The Vision of Professor Squarepunt" by Bertrand Russell
- "Milo and the Mathemagician" by Norton Juster

=== Irregular Figures ===
- "Cartoon" by Saul Steinberg
- "Sixteen Stones" by Samuel Beckett
- "O'Brien's Table" by J.L. Synge
- "The Abominable Mr. Gunn" by Robert Graves
- "Coconuts" by Ben Ames Williams
- "Euclid and the Bright Boy" by J.L. Synge
- "The Purse of Fortunatus" (an excerpt from Sylvie and Bruno) by Lewis Carroll
- "Cartoon" by Saul Steinberg
- "The Symbolic Logic of Murder" by John Reese

=== Simple Harmonic Motions ===
- "Cartoon" James Frankfort
- "The Square of the Hypotenuse" Saul Chaplin & Johnny Mercer
- "The Ta Ta" Joseph Charles Holbrooke & Sidney H. Sime

=== Dividends and Remainders ===
This section includes a collection of poems, cartoons, anecdotes, and limericks. The final pages describe Mrs. Miniver's problem.
