= Top-rated United States television programs of 2013–14 =

This table displays the top-rated primetime television series of the 2013–14 season as measured by Nielsen Media Research.

Rank	Program	Network	Rating
1	Sunday Night Football	NBC	12.6
1	NCIS	CBS	12.6
3	The Big Bang Theory	CBS	12.3
4	NCIS: Los Angeles	CBS	10.3
5	Dancing with the Stars	ABC	10.0
6	The Blacklist	NBC	9.5
7	Person of Interest	CBS	9.0
8	The Voice	NBC	8.9
9	Blue Bloods	CBS	8.8
10	The Voice — Tuesday	NBC	8.6
11	Grey's Anatomy	ABC	8.5
12	Castle	ABC	8.3
13	Criminal Minds	CBS	8.2
13	Scandal	ABC	8.2
15	Resurrection	ABC	8.1
16	CSI: Crime Scene Investigation	CBS	7.8
17	60 Minutes	CBS	7.7
18	Elementary	CBS	7.6
18	The Good Wife	CBS	7.6
18	Modern Family	ABC	7.6
21	Hawaii Five-0	CBS	7.5
22	American Idol — Wednesday	FOX	7.4
23	The Mentalist	CBS	7.3
24	The Millers	CBS	7.1
25	Survivor	CBS	7.0
25	American Idol — Thursday	FOX	7.0
27	Two and a Half Men	CBS	6.8
28	How I Met Your Mother	CBS	6.6
29	Chicago Fire	NBC	6.5
29	Intelligence	CBS	6.5
