= Homer Nearing =

Homer C. Nearing Jr (April 15, 1915 – May 29, 2004) was an American professor and author of mathematically themed short fiction, often under the byline "H. Nearing Jr.".

== Fiction and poetry ==
Nearing is best known for his humorous Professor Cleanth Penn Ransom series published in The Magazine of Fantasy and Science Fiction in the early 1950s, with the protagonist being a surreal head of the mathematics department at Uh-Uh University. One of Nearing's Professor Ransom short stories "The Maladjusted Classroom" was reprinted in the 1954 edition of The Best from Fantasy and Science Fiction while "The Cerebrative Psittacoid" was reprinted in Best SF, edited by Edmund Crispin. His story "The Mathematical Voodoo," about a teacher struggling to teach math to students, was reprinted in Fantasia Mathematica, a 1958 anthology on mathematical topics compiled by Clifton Fadiman. A sequel featuring Professor Ransom entitled "The Hermeneutical Doughnut" was published in Fadiman's sequel anthology "The Mathematical Magpie".

Seven of the Professor Ransom stories from F&SF were also reprinted alongside four new stories in The Sinister Researches of C.P. Ransom, released in 1954 by Doubleday. The collection functioned as a "consistently funny" fix-up novel about the attempts by a pair of professors to create a union between science and the arts by experimenting with different strange devices. The book was reprinted in paperback in 1969 by Curtis Books and rereleased in 2015 by Singularity&Co, with a new review in Amazing Stories calling the stories "delightfully whimsical."

Nearing also published poetry in The New Yorker.

== Academic career ==
In addition to writing fiction, Nearing was a published expert on historical English poetry and on British traditions concerning Julius Caesar.

He was a student at the University of Pennsylvania, both at the undergraduate and graduate levels, and as an undergraduate competed on the university's varsity swimming team, earning a letter in 1934, 1935, and 1936. After earning bachelor's and master's degrees, he completed his doctorate there in 1944, with the dissertation English Historical Poetry, 1599-1641.

After working as a schoolteacher at Perkiomen School and the Episcopal Academy and as a manager at a shipbuilding company, he became a professor of English at Pennsylvania Military College, which became Widener University in 1972. The Homer C. Nearing Jr. Distinguished Professorship at Widener University is named for him.

== Personal life ==
Nearing married Alice Eleanor Jones, who like Nearing earned a doctorate in English from the University of Pennsylvania in 1944 and wrote speculative fiction. They had two children.

== Bibliography ==
- English Historical Poetry, 1599–1641 (1945)
- The Sinister Researches of C.P. Ransom (Doubleday, 1954, 217 pp.) Dust jacket design by Edward Gorey.
