= Fantasia Mathematica =

Book by Clifton Fadiman

- First edition
- Author: Clifton Fadiman
- Language: English
- Genre: Anthology
- Publisher: Simon & Schuster
- Publication date: 1958
- Publication place: United States
- Media type: Print (Hardcover and Paperback)
- Pages: 298

Fantasia Mathematica is an anthology published in 1958 containing stories, humor, poems, etc., all on mathematical topics, compiled by Clifton Fadiman. A companion volume was published as The Mathematical Magpie (1962). The volume contains writing by authors including Robert Heinlein, Aldous Huxley, H. G. Wells, and Martin Gardner.

== Contents ==
- "Introduction" by Clifton Fadiman

=== Odd numbers ===
- "Young Archimedes" by Aldous Huxley
- "Pythagoras and the Psychoanalyst" by Arthur Koestler
- "Mother and the Decimal Point" by Richard Llewellyn
- "Jurgen Proves It by Mathematics" by James Branch Cabell
- "Peter Learns Arithmetic" by H. G. Wells
- "Socrates and the Slave" by Plato
- "The Death of Archimedes" by Karel Čapek

=== Imaginaries ===
- "The Devil and Simon Flagg" by Arthur Porges
- "—And He Built a Crooked House" by Robert A. Heinlein
- "Inflexible Logic" by Russell Maloney
- "The No-Sided Professor" by Martin Gardner
- "Superiority" by Arthur C. Clarke
- "The Mathematical Voodoo" by H. Nearing, Jr.
- "Expedition" by Fredric Brown
- "The Captured Cross-Section" by Miles J. Breuer, M.D.
- "A. Botts and the Moebius Strip" by William Hazlett Upson
- "God and the Machine" by Nigel Balchin
- "The Tachypomp" by Edward Page Mitchell
- "The Island of Five Colors" by Martin Gardner
- "The Last Magician" by Bruce Elliott
- "A Subway Named Moebius" by A. J. Deutsch
- "The Universal Library" by Kurd Lasswitz
- "Postscript to "The Universal Library"" by Willy Ley
- "John Jones's Dollar" by Harry Stephen Keeler

=== Fractions ===
- "A New Ballad of Sir Patrick Spens" by Arthur T. Quiller-Couch
- "The Unfortunate Topologist" by Cyril Kornbluth
- "There Once Was a Breathy Baboon" by Sir Arthur Eddington
- "Yet What Are All..." by Lewis Carroll
- "Twinkle, Twinkle, Little Star" by Ralph Barton
- "Mathematical Love" by Andrew Marvell
- "The Circle" by Christopher Morley
- "The Circle and the Square" by Thomas Dekker
- "Euclid Alone Has Looked on Beauty Bare" by Edna St. Vincent Millay
- "Euclid" by Vachel Lindsay
- "To Think That Two and Two Are Four" by A. E. Housman
- "The Uses of Mathematics" by Samuel Butler
- "Arithmetic" by Carl Sandburg
- "Threes (To Be Sung By Niels Bohr)" by John Atherton
- "Plane Geometry" by Emma Rounds
- "He Thought He Saw Electrons Swift" by Herbert Dingle
- "Fearsome Fable" by Bruce Elliott
- "Bertrand Russell's Dream" by G. H. Hardy
- "For All Practical Purposes" by C. Stanley Ogilvy
- "Eternity: A Nightmare" by Lewis Carroll
- "An Infinity of Guests" by George Gamow
- "∞" by Sir Arthur Eddington
- "No Power on Earth" by William Whewell
- "(x + 1)" by Edgar Allan Poe
- "The Receptive Bosom" by Edward Shanks
- "Leinbach's Proof" by Arthur Schnitzler
- "Problem from The New Yorker: "Talk of the Town""
- "A Letter to Tennyson from Mathematical Gazette"
- "A Fable from Mathematical Gazette"
- "There Was a Young Man from Trinity" by Anonymous
- "There Was an Old Man Who Said, "Do"" by Anonymous
- "Relativity" by Anonymous
- "There Was a Young Fellow Named Fisk" by Anonymous
