= The Tachypomp =

1874 science-fiction short story

Illustration of "The Tachypomp" by Reginald Bathurst Birch for The Century Magazine (May 1913)

"The Tachypomp" is a short story by Edward Page Mitchell originally published March 1874 in Scribner's Monthly, an American literary magazine. (Note: "The Tachypomp" is sometimes said to have first been published anonymously in The Sun in January 1874, but no evidence has been found of the story being published in The Sun. Mitchell wrote in his memoirs that he submitted the story to Scribner's which published the story in its March 1874 issue, and credited Mitchell in the volume contents list.) It was Mitchell's first science-fiction story. Mitchell was known for his editorial work on The Sun, but because most of his science-fiction stories were published anonymously, they were largely forgotten until their rediscovery in the early 1970s.

"The Tachypomp" is an early use of mathematics as the principal premise of a science-fiction story, and it was one of the first to use the word "android", here used to describe a purely mechanical creature.

== Publishing information ==
After the original publication in Scribner's Monthly, the story was reprinted in Scribner's Stories by American Authors (1884, reprinted in 1891), The Century Magazine (May 1913) with four illustrations by Reginald Bathurst Birch, and Clifton Fadiman's Fantasia Mathematica (1958). In 1973, "The Tachypomp" was reprinted alongside many more of Mitchell's stories as The Crystal Man: Landmark Science Fiction, edited by Sam Moskowitz.

== Plot synopsis ==
Rivarol describing the tachypomp to Furnace; illustration by Birch

The plot revolves around Mr. Furnace's (the narrator) quest to marry his math professor's daughter, Abscissa Surd. Unfortunately, Professor Surd does not approve of him, as Furnace does not excel in mathematics. Furnace writes to Surd with his intentions, and is invited to the professor's house, but falls asleep waiting for him to arrive. Furnace dreams that Surd sets him a challenge: to discover the principle of infinite speed. Unable to solve this, Furnace turns to his tutor, Rivarol, who invents a solution: the tachypomp. Furnace wakes up on Surd's arrival, who apologises for being late, and agrees to allow Furnace to marry Abscissa.

In the narrator's dream, his tutor Rivarol tells him about several scientific discoveries. These include:

- an android capable of computing vulgar fractions and composing sonnets;
- a hollow tube leading through the earth to the Kerguelen Islands (where a Dutch navigator Rhuyghens is said to have found an "abysmal pit");
- a solution to squaring the circle;
- a perpetual motion machine;
- the tachypomp.

== Tachypomp ==
The term "tachypomp" refers to a fictional device theoretically capable of attaining infinite speed. The machine itself is a series of trains (or any train-like vehicle) each half the length of the preceding, stacked vertically. The trains would thus move in tandem, and their speeds would be added to find the speed of the train on top. For instance, if the bottom train were moving 40 miles per hour and the train above that 40 miles per hour, then the speed of the higher train would be 80 miles per hour.

Though an interesting idea in theory, as presented it ignores several key physics ideas.

- It assumes trains possess instantaneous acceleration, so if a train can go 60 mph it can go .1 miles in 6 seconds AND be stopped on either side.
- It ignores air resistance increasing with speed (in fact, with the square of speed).
- Each higher train would need more energy to reach max speed and lower cars sliding underneath their wheels would not help.
- Materials possess only so much heat resistance and strength.

Even if the trains were given time to accelerate one by one in an infinite airless tunnel, the special theory of relativity dictates that the speed of light in vacuum is absolute and represents an ultimate speed limit for the universe (at least locally). If a Tachypomp were constructed, relativistic principles such as length contraction and time dilation would prevent any component of the system from achieving or exceeding the speed of light.

The final line of the story, "Still I can see no reason why the Tachypomp should not have succeeded. Can you?" would be definitively addressed thirty years later, when these relativistic effects were laid out by Albert Einstein in 1905.
