= Theoni =

Theoni is a feminine given name. Notable people with the name include:

- Theoni V. Aldredge (1922–2011), Greek-American costume designer
- Theoni Pappas (born 1944), American mathematics teacher
