= List of fictional gynoids =

This list of fictional gynoids is sorted by media genre and alphabetised by character name or media title. Gynoids are humanoid robots that are gendered to be perceived as feminine or to mimic the bodily appearance of human women. They appear widely in science fiction film and art. They are also known as female androids, female robots or fembots, although some media have used other terms such as robotess, cyberdoll or "skin-job". Although there are a variety of gynoids across genres, this list excludes female cyborgs (e.g. Seven of Nine in Star Trek: Voyager), non-humanoid robots (e.g. EVE from Wall-E), virtual female characters (Dot Matrix and women from the cartoon ReBoot, Simone from Simone (2002 film), Samantha from Her), holograms (Hatsune Miku in concert, Cortana from Halo), non-robotic haunted dolls, and general Artificial intelligence network systems (SAL 9000, GLaDOS from Portal). Gynoids for Japanese manga and anime are grouped separately.

== In film ==
- Alice, from Subservience (2024)
- The Alienator, from Alienator (1989)
- Alsatia Zevo, from Toys (1992)
- Assorted gynoids from Westworld (1973)
- Annalee Call, a synthetic or auton, from Alien Resurrection (1997)
- Apple, a friendship model robot, from Turbo Kid (2015)
- Assorted gynoids from Robot Stories (2003)
- Athena, an animatronic recruiter that resembles a girl, from Tomorrowland (2015)
- Ava, an android created in the likeness and uses the brain scan of a deceased scientist of the same name, from The Machine (2013)
- Ava, from Ex Machina (2015)
- Başak, from Japon İşi (1987)
- In Blade Runner (1982) and Blade Runner 2049 (2017), androids and gynoids are known as Replicants. Notable characters include: Pris Stratton, Zhora Salome, and Rachael Tyrell
- Calamity Drone and Velma Staplebot from The Lego Movie (2014)
- Carl Petersen's Fembot army in Some Girls Do (1969)
- Cassandra, from Android (1982)
- Catherine, from Catherine and I (1980)
- Chalmers, from Spacehunter: Adventures in the Forbidden Zone (1983)
- Cherry 2000, from Cherry 2000 (1987)
- Dot Matrix, the droid assistant to Princess Vespa, from Spaceballs (1987)
- Eva, from Eva (2011)
- Eve, from Eve of Destruction (1991)
- Fembots, from Austin Powers series (1997, 1999, 2002)
- Fembots, from Dr. Goldfoot and the Bikini Machine (1965) and Dr. Goldfoot and the Girl Bombs (1966)
- G2, from Inspector Gadget 2 (2003)
- Galatea, from Bicentennial Man (1999)
- Galaxina, from Galaxina (1980)
- Ilia probe, an android constructed by Vger using the likeness of Enterprise crew member Ilia, from Star Trek: The Motion Picture (1979)
- Iris, from Companion (2025)
- Kyoko from Ex Machina (2015)
- KAY-Em 14, from Jason X (2001)
- Lenore, from Serenity (2005), is a LoveBot
- Lesli, the ship's computer that also takes the form of a gynoid, from The Dark Side of the Moon (1990)
- M3GAN (Model 3 Generative Android), an artificially intelligent gynoid designed as a companion robot for the protagonist, from the movie series of the same name.
- Maria, a.k.a. Maschinenmensch, from Metropolis (1927 film), described as the first memorable female robot in film.
- Morgan, from Morgan (2016 film)
- Olga, from The Perfect Woman (1949)
- Nila in Enthiran 2 Tamil movie
- In Omega Doom (1996), features a number of android and gynoid characters organized into two factions: Droids and Roms, with the latter being all female. Some of the characters in the film are cyborgs.
- Pioneer II, from "I Love Maria" (1988)
- Roberta, from Not Quite Human II (1989)
- Robot Bubs, from Space Sweepers (2021)
- Sara, from Soulm8te (2026)
- In Screamers (1995), the Autonomous Mobile Swords (AMS), also known as Screamers, are artificially intelligent self-replicating killing machines. Usually they are small creatures, but later "types" show they take the form of humans.
- Silica, from Starchaser: The Legend of Orin (1985)
- The Stepford Wives, in which the women are replaced with fembots.
- The Surrogates from Surrogates (2009)
- Thia and Tessa, from Predator: Badlands (2025)
- T-X (Terminatrix), from Terminator 3: Rise of the Machines (2003), a liquid-metal shapeshifting gynoid assassin that typically takes on the form of a woman.

== In television ==
- Aki from Blood Drive (2017)
- The Android, from Dark Matter
- Android One-Zero/Mana from Ultraman Ginga S
- Andromeda, from A for Andromeda (1961) and The Andromeda Breakthrough (1962)
- In Andromeda (2000-2004), Doyle is a gynoid; and Rommie is a ship's computer given a human form.
- ANI (Android Nursing Interface) from Mercy Point (1998–1999)
- In Battlestar Galactica (2004), the robot-based race of Cylons come in two versions: the metal-clad Centurions known as "toasters", and the ones with flesh and blood on the inside known as "skin-jobs". They are implanted with memories that make them believe they are human. Notable female "skin-job" Cylons include: D'Anna Biers (Number Three), Number Six, Sharon Valerii (Number Eight), Tory Foster and Ellen Tigh.
- Botila from Kong: King of the Apes (2016-2018)
- Buffybot from Buffy the Vampire Slayer (1997–2004)
- Ashley Campbell from Cybergirl (2001–2002) is a Replicant who poses as a teenage girl but is actually a superheroine.
- Chrome, host of Perversions of Science
- Crawford, in the Red Dwarf episode "Trojan" (2012) is of an android species known as simulants.
- Demerzel from Foundation
- Dina, a fembot from the Wicked Science episode "Double Date" (2003)
- Doctor Who features a number of female companions and guest stars who have had android duplicates created:
  - Sarah Jane Smith was duplicated by the Kraals in the story "The Android Invasion" (1975)
  - Romana I and her living duplicate Princess Strella were both robotically duplicated by Madam Lamia for Count Grendel of Gracht in the story "The Androids of Tara" (1978)
  - Martha Jones was duplicated in the Doctor Who episodes "The Sontaran Strategem" and "The Poison Sky" (2008)
  - The series also featured robot or computerised versions of TV hosts in the episode Bad Wolf (2005), namely Davina McCall as the voice of the Davinadroid, Anne Robinson as the voice of the Anne Droid, Trinny Woodall as the voice of Trine-e and Susannah Constantine as the voice of Zu-Zana.
- Elly from Ultraman Max (2005)
- Eve from the 2015 TV series of the same name.
- Eve Edison from Mann & Machine (1992)
- Fembots, serving as adversaries in The Bionic Woman and The Six Million Dollar Man (1976–78)
- The TV series Humans, and its Swedish original, feature an array of androids and gynoids that are collectively referred to as synths, in the former, and hubots in the latter. Two prominent female synths from the former are Niska and Anita/Mia
- Intimate Robotic Companions, also known as Sexbots or Bangbots, from the Almost Human episode "Skin"
- Judy Cooper, robot girl from K.C. Undercover (2015)
- Outer Limits gynoids: Valerie 23, Mary 25, and Mona Lisa, all from their respective episodes of the same name.
- Piper from Emergence
- Rajni, from the Hindi TV comedy series Bahu Hamari Rajni Kant (2016–17)
- Rhoda Miller from My Living Doll (1964–65)
- Rosie Robot, Robot maid in cartoon List of The Jetsons characters
- The Sarah Connor Chronicles (2008) gynoids:
  - Cameron, a Terminator programmed to protect the teenage John Connor
  - Catherine Weaver, a model T-1001 which can change shape
  - Rosie, a red-haired Terminator who attacks Cameron in an episode
- Stargate franchise gynoids:
  - Reese, the android creator of the Replicators, in the episode "Menace" (2002) from the series Stargate SG-1
  - Replicator Second, the human form Replicators, in the episode "Unnatural Selection" (2002) from the series Stargate SG-1
  - Replicator Fourth, the human form Replicators, in the episode "Unnatural Selection" (2002) from the series Stargate SG-1
  - Replicator Sixth, the human form Replicators, in the episode "Unnatural Selection" (2002) from the series Stargate SG-1
  - Replicator Samantha Carter, the human form Replicators, in the episode "New Order" (2004) from the series Stargate SG-1
  - Replicator Asuran Counelors #1 and #2, the human form Replicators, in the episode "Progeny" (2006) from the series Stargate Atlantis
  - Replicator Arria, the human form Replicators, in the episode "Progeny" (2006) from the series Stargate Atlantis
  - Replicator Weir, the human form Replicators, in the episode "Be All My Sins Remember'd" (2008) from the series Stargate Atlantis
  - Replicator Lia, the human form Replicators, in the episode "Ghost in the Machine" (2008) from the series Stargate Atlantis
  - Replicator: Friendly Replicator Android, the human form Replicators, in the episodes "Be All My Sins Remember'd" (2008), and "Ghost in the Machine" (2008) from the series Stargate Atlantis
- Star Trek gynoids:
  - Andrea, in "What Are Little Girls Made Of?" an episode from Star Trek: The Original Series (1966)
  - Andromedan gynoids, in "I, Mudd" an episode from Star Trek: The Original Series (1967)
  - Juliana Tainer, a replica of Data's "mother" in the Star Trek: The Next Generation episode "Inheritance" (1993)
  - Lal, a gynoid built by Data, in the Star Trek: The Next Generation episode "The Offspring" (1990)
  - Losira replicants, in "That Which Survives" an episode from Star Trek: The Original Series (1969)
  - Rayna Kapec, in "Requiem for Methuselah" an episode from Star Trek: The Original Series (1969)
  - Ruth, a gynoid constructed from an acquaintance of Kirk in "Shore Leave" an episode from Star Trek: The Original Series (1966)
- Thelma from Space Cases (1996–1997)
- The Twilight Zone gynoids:
  - Alicia, in "The Lonely", an episode from The Twilight Zone (1959)
  - Jana Loren in "The Lateness of the Hour", an episode from The Twilight Zone (1960)
  - Grandma in "I Sing the Body Electric", an episode from The Twilight Zone (1959)
- Verda in "The Android Machine" and "Revolt of the Androids" episodes from Lost in Space (1966)
- Vicki, short for Voice Input Child Identicant (V.I.C.I.), and Vanessa from Small Wonder (1985–1989)
- In Westworld, the android and gynoid characters are called hosts. Notable hosts in the TV series include Dolores Abernathy and Maeve Millay.

== In anime and manga ==
- Alice Zuberg, from Sword Art Online: Alicization (2018)
- Alpha Hatsuseno, main character from Yokohama Kaidashi Kikou (1994–2006)
- Arale Norimaki, from Dr. Slump
- In Bubblegum Crisis, the androids and gynoids are known as boomers.
- Chachamaru Karakuri, from Negima
- In Chobits, the androids and gynoids are known as persocoms. They include Chi, Sumomo, Yuzuki, Kotoko, Freya
- Drossel von Flügel, from Fireball (2009)
- Eimi Yoshikawa, from All Purpose Cultural Cat Girl Nuku Nuku (1998) is a gynoid.
- The Ghost in the Shell franchise has a number of gynoid characters: Dolls, Geisha robots and Operators. Project 2501, a rogue AI programmed to manipulate global politics, creates a cybernetic body in the form of a woman and transfers itself into the body to escape its creators.
- In Hand Maid May (2000), the gynoids are known as Cyberdolls. They include: May, Sara, Rena, Kei, and Mami.
- Harumi, a Raalgon spy gynoid, from Irresponsible Captain Tylor
- In Heaven's Lost Property, the gynoids are known as Angeloids. The main ones are: Ikaros, Nymph, Astraea, the Harpies, and Chaos.
- Honey, the title character of Go Nagai's Cutie Honey media franchise, is a "Super Android".
- In Another World With My Smartphone features nine separate gynoids known as the Babylon Sisters
- Janice Em, from Robotech II: The Sentinels
- Jan Pu, a ship's autopilot housed in a gynoid body, from Kashimashi
- Kiku No. 8, from Wandaba Style (2003)
- Mahoro Andou, from Mahoromatic (2000–2003).
- In Mazinger series, the main female robots characters are Aphrodite A, Venus A, Diana A and Minerva X. They have more prominence in Mazinger Angels (2004–2006) manga
- Kazamori Sasa, from Un-Go, is a Real Artificial Intelligence program that takes the body of a girl
- Mecha Rinrin, from the bishōjo manga Sister Princess (2001–2002)
- Melfina, a "bio-android" from Outlaw Star (1997)
- Naomi Armitage, from Armitage III (1995, 1997, 2002) was a Type III robot, called a Third, a robot superficially identical to a human that was fully functional to the point of females being capable of pregnancy and bearing a fully human child.
- Nono, from Diebuster (2004–2006)
- Odette Yoshizawa, title character from Karakuri Odette (2005–2007), is a gynoid who attends a regular high school while keeping her identity a secret.
- Pino, from Ergo Proxy (2006), is an android known as an AutoReiv.
- In Plastic Memories, androids and gynoids created by the SAI Corporation are collectively known as Giftia. The lead female character, Isla, is a Giftia.
- R. Dorothy Wayneright, from The Big O (1999–2003)
- Roboko, from Doraemon
- Roboko, from World Conquest Zvezda Plot
- Ropponmatsu I and Ropponmatsu II, from Excel Saga
- In Rozen Maiden (2004–2006), the gynoids are called Rozen Maidens and are sentient bisque dolls.
- Ruru Amour / Cure Amour, gynoid's numbering is RUR-9500, from Hugtto! PreCure (2018) .
- In Saber Marionette (1995–1999), the gynoids are called Marionettes. They include: Bloodberry, Cherry, Lime, Marine, and others
- Pixie (Mimi), from I Dream of Mimi (1997)
- Shion Ashimori is an AI in an artificial robot schoolgirl body in the anime Sing a Bit of Harmony.
- Sammy, from Time of Eve
- Sigel, a mannequin fashioned into a gynoid by Skuld in Oh My Goddess! (1988–2014)
- Solty Revant, from SoltyRei (2005–2006), is a gynoid known as a Resemble. She is later revealed to be one of three core computers that oversee the planet.
- In Steel Angel Kurumi (1999–2000), the gynoids are known as Steel Angels. They include: Kurumi, Saki, Karinka, and others.
- Teruru Ichigaya, from Knights of Sidonia (2009–2015)
- Tima, the mysterious girl in Metropolis (2001)
- Uran in Astro Boy.
- Yuria and other sex robots from Yuria 100 Shiki
- Vivy Elizabeth in Vivy: Fluorite Eye's Song.
- Noir Animated Series |2022 ||Synduality Noir(TV series)
- Yuugure in towa no Yuugure

== In animation ==
- Gwendolyn, from Rick and Morty, in episode Raising Gazorpazorp (2014)
- Miscellaneous fembots from Futurama (1999–2011)
- Miley Cyrus, in "Hannah Banana", a 2009 episode of Family Guy
- Jenny Wakeman, Melody, and others from My Life as a Teenage Robot (2002)
- Jinmay from Super Robot Monkey Team Hyperforce Go!
- Julie-8, from Romie-0 and Julie-8
- Lesliebots, from The Venture Bros. episode "Past Tense" (2004)
- Mazuma from Ben 10: Omniverse
- Molly Mange, from SWAT Kats: The Radical Squadron (1994)
- Obliteratrix from the Scooby-Doo! Mystery Incorporated episode "Pawn of Shadows" (2011)
- Penny Polendina from RWBY (2013)
- Pixal from Ninjago: Masters of Spinjitzu
- Robecca Steam from Monster High
- Rosie from The Jetsons (1962)
- Robotica, from DuckTales episode Metal Attraction (1990)
- Six, from Tripping the Rift (2004)
- Tari and Belle Fontiere, from the Australian animated web series Meta Runner (2019)

== In literature, comics, and theatre ==
- Amelia from the short story "The Lady Automaton" (1901) by Ernest Edward Kellett
- Barbara, leader of a robot-revolutionary group in Hard Boiled by Frank Miller and Geof Darrow.
- Brainiac 8, a.k.a. Indigo, from DC's Outsiders (2003)
- Cho, from Divine Endurance (1984) by Gwyneth Jones
- Chworktap, an android modeled after Botticelli's The Birth of Venus, from Philip José Farmer's novel Venus on the Half-Shell (1975)
- Cyanure, from Spirou et Fantasio
- Dee Model, from Ken MacLeod's The Stone Canal "...technically a decerebrate clone manipulated by a computer, but I feel like me"
- Disposable women, from an early issue of Mad Magazine (1950s)
- Dors Venabili, wife of Hari Seldon from Asimov's Foundation Series (1988)
- Freya Nakamichi-47, an android sexbot, in Saturn's Children by Charles Stross (2008)
- Guri, assistant to Prince Xizor in the novel Shadows of the Empire (1996)
- Hadaly, from Viller's de L'Isle Adam's novel L'Eve future (1879)
- Helen O'Loy, from Lester del Rey's short story "Helen O'Loy" (1938)
- Iko and others from Marissa Meyer's The Lunar Chronicles book series
- Irona from Richie Rich
- Jacie (or JC-F31-333), from the play Comic Potential (1998) by Alan Ayckbourn
- Jenny Chow in the play The Intelligent Design of Jenny Chow (2005)
- Joanna Eberhart and assorted suburban housewives in Ira Levin's novel The Stepford Wives (1972)
- Jocasta from Marvel Comics The Avengers comic book (1977), first enemy then teammate to the Avengers
- Landaree, a Solarian gynoid from Asimov's Robots and Empire
- Lucy, the 'syntec' (robot with living human skin) prostitute in The Holy Machine by Chris Beckett (2004)
- Mimi the Mekka Girl, from Mickey Mouse in "The World of Tomorrow" by Floyd Gottfredson (1944)
- Momo-tan, May, and Bubbles AI AnthroPc characters, in the web comic Questionable Content
- NAN 300F, from the play by Alan Ayckbourn Henceforward... (1987)
- Olimpia, from Der Sandmann by E.T.A. Hoffmann (1816)
- Olympia, from Jacques Offenbach's Les contes d'Hoffmann (1881)
- Ping, from the web comic Megatokyo (2000)
- Tina, also known as Platinum, from the Metal Men comic books (1962–1970)
- Various androids and gynoids from the play R.U.R. (1921)
- H_rd (Herd) from The Risen Empire by Scott Westerfield

== In video games ==
- 2B and A2, from NieR: Automata, two combat gynoids developed as part of the "YoRHa" android forces
- Accord, an android model from Drakengard 3 that is capable of jumping between timelines and universes to observe "Singularities"
- Adjutant, an adviser and announcer from Starcraft and Heroes of the Storm
- Alisa Bosconovitch, from Tekken 6: Bloodline Rebellion
- Aria and Qingyi from Zenless Zone Zero
- Aris from Blue Archive
- Aschen Brödel and Cardia Basirissa from Super Robot Taisen OG Saga: Endless Frontier
- Ash from Apex Legends and Titanfall 2
- Atri, from Atri: My Dear Moments
- The BlazBlue series features a number of gynoids including Nu-13, Mu-12 and Lambda-11
- Miss Bloody Rachel from Viewtiful Joe 2 and Viewtiful Joe: Red Hot Rumble
- Clarity and Charity, lawyer gynoid "sisters" from Primordia
- Curie, from "Fallout 4", when she is an android form called a synth
- Demi, from Phantasy Star 4 (1993)
- Devola and Popola, twin android models who appear in both NieR and NieR: Automata, and were created to oversee "Project Gestalt"
- Dorothy Haze, from VA-11 Hall-A
- Echo, from Overwatch
- EDI, the AI of the Normandy SR-2 in Mass Effect 2, who later gains a repurposed gynoid body in Mass Effect 3.
- Elsa, from Demonbane (2004–2006)
- Essentia 2000, from YIIK: A Postmodern RPG (2019)
- Eve, from Stellar Blade (2024)
- Dr. Eva Core from Mass Effect 3
- Incarose and Corundum, from the Nintendo DS RPG Tales of Hearts (2008), is a mechanoid
- Ineffa and Sandrone from Genshin Impact
- Kara, from Detroit: Become Human, is a housekeeper gynoid who escapes after gaining consciousness.
- Lucy and various Replicants from Blade Runner
- Luna, from Zero Escape: Virtue's Last Reward, is a GAULEM (General-purpose AUtonomous-Control Labor Electronic Machine)
- Marina Liteyears, from Mischief Makers
- Merope, from Master X Master
- Monitor Kernel Access / Monika.chr / Monika, from Doki Doki Literature Club!
- Muriel, from Paragon
- P.A.S.S., from N.U.D.E.@Natural Ultimate Digital Experiment (2003)
- Persona characters:
  - Aigis from Persona 3
  - Metis from Persona 3 FES
  - Labrys from Persona 4 Arena
- Petra, from Ultima VII Part Two: Serpent Isle (1992), is an automaton
- Roll, Splash Woman, Alia, Iris, Layer, Palette and Fairy Leviathan from various Mega Man series (1987–2006)
- Supervisor, from Rise of the Robots (1994), is a gynoid nanomorph. She controls the Electrocorp factory.
- The visual novel series To Heart features a number of gynoids including Multi, Serio, Feel, and Ilfa
- Unreal series gynoids, featured throughout (1998–2006)
- Vivienne, from Phantasy Star Portable (2008), is a CAST, the term used for androids in the game.
- W-D40, from Space Quest V (1993), is a terminoid, an assassin android
- The Xenosaga series features a number of gynoids, including KOS-MOS, T-elos, and Doctus
- Yumemi Hoshino, from the visual novel Planetarian: The Reverie of a Little Planet (2004)
- Looks To The Moon, From Rain World

== In music ==
- Title character of "Black Velveteen" by Lenny Kravitz from the album 5 (1998)
- Title character of "Electric Barbarella" by Duran Duran from the album Medazzaland (1997), a tribute to the movie Barbarella whose video featured bandmates interacting with a robotic sex doll
- The music video for "Turn Up the Radio" by Autograph (1984) features a robot woman who asks the band to sign in.
- The album cover for Down for the Count by Y&T (1985) features a female robot being bitten in the neck by a vampire.
- The album cover for Just Push Play by Aerosmith (2001) features a "curvy female robot in a Marilyn Monroe-like pose.". The robot was designed by Hajime Sorayama.
- The album Metropolis: Suite I (The Chase) by Janelle Monáe (2007) follows the adventures of a female android named Cindi Mayweather and was inspired by the Metropolis 1927 film. Several of Monáe's albums follow up on this theme.
- The music video for "The Ghost Inside" by Broken Bells features a female android played by Christina Hendricks.
- The music video for "The World Is Not Enough" by Garbage, features a female robot resembling lead singer Shirley Manson who is able to kill with a kiss. Manson later portrayed the gynoid Catherine Weaver in the TV series, Terminator: The Sarah Connor Chronicles.
- The song "Yours Truly, 2095" on the album Time by Electric Light Orchestra. "I met someone who looks a lot like you, she does the things you do, but she is an IBM"
- The music video for "All Is Full of Love" on the album Homogenic by Björk features two robots with Björk faces.
- Maria Socket, the lead vocalist and keyboard player of Robot Band PicPac.

== Miscellaneous ==
- Female robot themes of the pinball machines The Machine: Bride of Pin•Bot and Xenon

== See also ==
- List of fictional computers
- List of fictional cyborgs
- List of fictional robots and androids
