= Intelligence (American TV series) =

American cyber-themed action-adventure television series

- Genre: Action/Adventure; Drama; Espionage; Science fiction
- Created by: Michael Seitzman
- Developed by: Michael Seitzman; Tripp Vinson
- Starring: Josh Holloway; Meghan Ory; Michael Rady; John Billingsley; P. J. Byrne; Marg Helgenberger
- Theme music composer: Clinton Shorter
- Composer: Clinton Shorter
- Country of origin: United States
- Original language: English
- No. of seasons: 1
- No. of episodes: 13

Production
- Executive producers: Michael Seitzman; Tripp Vinson; Barry Schindel
- Producer: Barry O'Brien
- Production locations: Vancouver, British Columbia, Canada (pilot); Los Angeles, California (series)
- Running time: 43 minutes
- Production companies: Michael Seitzman's Pictures; Tripp Vinson Productions; Barry Schindel Company; CBS Television Studios; ABC Studios

Original release
- Network: CBS
- Release: January 7 – March 31, 2014

Intelligence is an American cyber-themed action-adventure television series. The series aired on CBS in the United States, and premiered on January 7, 2014. On May 10, 2014, CBS cancelled the series after one season.

The series was created by Michael Seitzman, who serves as an executive producer along with Tripp Vinson and Barry Schindel, for ABC Studios and CBS Television Studios.

== Plot ==
Gabriel Vaughn is an ex–United States Army Delta Force operator and a high-tech intelligence operative enhanced with a super-computer microchip in his brain. With this implant, Gabriel is the first human ever to be connected directly into the globalized information grid. He can get into any of its data centers and access key intel files in the fight to protect the United States from its enemies. Lillian Strand, the Director of the United States Cyber Command, who supports Gabriel and oversees the unit's missions, assigns United States Secret Service Special Agent Riley Neal to protect Gabriel from outside threats, as well as from his appetite for reckless, unpredictable behaviors and disregard for protocols. Meanwhile, Gabriel takes advantage of his chip to search for his wife, CIA officer Amelia Hayes, who disappeared years ago after being sent by the CIA to infiltrate and prevent the Lashkar-e-Taiba from carrying out a terrorist attack in Mumbai, India.

== Cast and characters ==
=== Main cast ===
- Josh Holloway as Gabriel Vaughn, an ex–Delta Force operator implanted with a chip that allows him to access the Global Information Grid.
- Marg Helgenberger as Lillian Strand, Director of the U.S. Cyber Command.
- Meghan Ory as U.S. CyberCom Special Agent Riley Neal, an ex–Secret Service agent assigned to protect Gabriel from external threats.
- Michael Rady as U.S. CyberCom Special Agent Chris Jameson
- John Billingsley as Shenendoah Cassidy, the neuroscientist responsible for creating the microchip that was implanted in Gabriel's brain.
- P. J. Byrne as Nelson Cassidy, son of Shenendoah Cassidy and one of the scientists working on the Clockwork Project.

=== Recurring cast ===
- Tomas Arana as Adam Weatherly, Director of National Intelligence.
- Lance Reddick as Jeffrey Tetazoo, Director of Central Intelligence
- Peter Coyote as Leland Strand, father of Lillian Strand
- Zuleikha Robinson as Amelia Hayes, Gabriel's wife and a former CIA field officer.
- Faye Kingslee as Mei Chen, a Chinese national who is also implanted with a stolen chip similar to the one in Vaughn. However her chip is more advanced, allowing her to do things Gabriel cannot such as enter his mind. Grace Huang played Mei Chen in the pilot.

== Episodes ==
No.	Title	Directed by	Written by	Original release date	U.S. viewers (millions)
1	"Pilot"	David Semel	Michael Seitzman	January 7, 2014	16.49
Secret Service Agent Riley Neal (Meghan Ory) is brought into the U.S. Cyber Command and tasked by Lillian Strand (Marg Helgenberger) with the assignment of protecting Gabriel Vaughn (Josh Holloway), an ex–Delta Force operative with a chip implanted in his brain that allows him to access the global information grid. The U.S. Cyber Command investigates the kidnapping of one of its top scientists Shenendoah Cassidy (John Billingsley) in relation to a second chip being created, and Gabriel searches for his missing wife.
2	"Red X"	Aaron Lipstadt	Aaron Ginsburg and Wade McIntyre	January 13, 2014	6.20
After a suicide bomber blows up a U.S. Marine outpost in the Khost Province of Afghanistan with an undetectable bomb he ingested, the U.S. Cyber Command is tasked with investigating the threat of a second attack using the same type of explosives. Meanwhile, in the process of investigating, Gabriel meets face to face with his missing wife (Zuleikha Robinson) for the first time since she went undercover.
3	"Mei Chen Returns"	Stephen Williams	Shintaro Shimosawa	January 20, 2014	5.77
Gabriel and Riley are tasked with finding Kate Anderson (Annie Wersching), a high level CIA analyst who fled the country with sensitive intelligence, before it falls into the wrong hands. Meanwhile, Gabriel discovers that Mei Chen (Faye Kingslee) is alive after her operation and has the capability to be inside his mind using her new and improved chip.
4	"Secrets of the Secret Service"	Rob Bailey	Matthew Lau	January 27, 2014	6.84
Gabriel and his team are assigned to rescue two freelance journalists (Tania Raymonde and Aaron Benore) captured by the Syrian Armed Forces before they are executed on national television. Meanwhile Riley must work with her ex-boyfriend (Michael Trucco) and the truth about their past is revealed.
5	"The Rescue"	Alrick Riley	Barry O'Brien	February 3, 2014	7.55
Gabriel and Riley search for the daughter of a senator (Abbie Cobb) and her friend (Kimberly Whalen), who have been kidnapped by Hector (Carlos Sanz), the boss of a Mexican cartel, who demands that the senator (Robert Curtis Brown) ends the sale of a U.S. spy satellite to Mexico in exchange for the safety of his daughter and her friend.
6	"Patient Zero"	Adam Davidson	Michael Seitzman	February 10, 2014	7.12
Gabriel and the CyberCom are tasked to investigate the outbreak of a deadly virus in Texas caused by a man (Ronnie Gene Blevins) who was thought to have been executed for killing two police officers. In the process they discover a conspiracy involving the Defense Intelligence Agency's research chief (Bill Smitrovich) into bioweapons.
7	"Size Matters"	Alrick Riley	Shintaro Shimosawa	February 17, 2014	5.85
Worldwide, scientists working on nanotechnology and artificial intelligence are mysteriously dying of internal bleeding, which are caused by nanites. When one of their prime suspects (David Marciano) is also killed, the suspicions turns to one of the Doc's former students (Tommy Dewey). Doc himself gets infected but after some tense moments they are able to save him. Meanwhile Gabriel and Riley go for a late night snack.
8	"Delta Force"	David Von Ancken	Aaron Ginsburg and Wade McIntyre	February 24, 2014	5.41
When several members of Bolivian government's opposition are assassinated, Gabriel and the team are sent to protect the last one, the candidate preferred by the U.S. government (Yancey Arias). It is learned that the assassin was Gabriel's best friend and a former Delta Force operator (Matt Gerald). However, things are not what they seem, and they join forces to protect the candidate and the U.S. Under-Secretary of State (Michael Albala).
9	"Athens"	Bill Eagles	Matthew Lau	March 3, 2014	5.35
Jin Cong (Will Yun Lee) escapes from prison in China. He unleashes an EMP on CyberCom, causing Gabriel to receive amnesia through the chip, and captures the complex, intent on retrieving the Athens list, a list of children with the same genetic mutation required to operate the chip. Worse yet, he alters CyberCom files to manipulate Gabriel into working for his side.
10	"Cain and Gabriel"	Ken Biller	Pamela Davis	March 10, 2014	6.62
The Witness Protection Database has been hacked and the perpetrator (Alan Ruck) begins blackmailing individuals from the list into making a paralytic chemical bomb, sending Gabriel, Riley, and Lillian to San Francisco to track him down.
11	"The Grey Hat"	Tim Hunter	Heidi Cole McAdams	March 17, 2014	5.30
When an advanced cyber-worm infiltrates a power grid in Los Angeles, Gabriel and Riley are tasked with tracking down the elusive hacker (Octavius J. Johnson) and preventing a nuclear meltdown.
12	"The Event Horizon"	Russell Lee Fine	Barry Schindel and Michael Seitzman	March 24, 2014	4.99
When the former intelligence head of CENTCOM, the deputy director of the FBI and his bodyguard are assassinated, U.S. CyberCom is asked to look into it. But when Gabriel cyber-renders the last few minutes of the CCTV footage, he sees himself in it. The DNI places Gabriel in 'protective custody' to see if the chip was hacked and whether Gabriel was 'remote-controlled' into doing it. But Gabriel and Riley escape and along with the rest of the team, they catch Mei-Chen. But when the team meets Lillian, Gabriel is shot and someone tries to shoot Mei Chen. Mei Chen then reveals that she was hired by someone in the U.S. Government to frame Gabriel.
13	"Being Human"	Stephen Williams	Michael Seitzman and Barry Schindel	March 31, 2014	5.55
Continuing from the previous episode, a wounded Gabriel directs Riley and Mei Chen to the house of his mother, a former combat nurse. While his mother (Debra Mooney) treats his bullet wound, Mei Chen and Gabriel co-render. Mei Chen reveals that a governor and possible presidential nominee could be the target of an assassination. It is later revealed that Weatherly (Tomas Arana), the Director of National Intelligence, is a sleeper agent for Iran, and he is the one behind everything. As he attempts to kill the governor, Gabriel and Riley arrest him. Later, Mei Chen is contracted to kill Weatherly in his floating prison by Leland Strand, Lillian's father.

== Influences ==
The plot is said to have been inspired by the novel Phoenix Island by John Dixon, but some critics have their reservations.

In episode 13, it was revealed that the name "Clockwork" was based on the 1879 short story "The Ablest Man in the World" by Edward Page Mitchell. The story is about a man who was mute and mentally handicapped and grew up in a mental asylum. His life was changed when a scientist replaced his brain with a clockwork device that intended to make the patient—who has become a Russian baron at the time of the story—become Russia's answer to Napoleon.

== Reception ==
=== Critical response ===
David Hinckley of New York Daily News gave the show three out of five stars. Tim Goodman of The Hollywood Reporter said the show goes overboard on the merging of humans and computer technology. Darren Franich of Entertainment Weekly said "those hoping the show will be Sawyer, P.I. will be disappointed, but there's potential." On Rotten Tomatoes, the series has an aggregate score of 38% based on 13 positive and 21 negative critic reviews. The website consensus reads: "Intelligence fails to live up to its name, with corny dialogue and overblown violence that cannot be rescued by its capable leading actors."

=== Awards and nominations ===
Year	Award	Category	Nominee	Result
2014	BMI Film & TV Awards	BMI TV Music Award	Clinton Shorter	Nominated

== See also ==
- Chuck (TV series)
- Jake 2.0
- Scorpion (TV series)
