= Alice Eleanor Jones =

American science fiction writer and journalist

Alice Eleanor Jones Nearing
- Born: Alice Eleanor Jones; 30 March 1916; Philadelphia, Pennsylvania
- Died: 6 November 1981 (aged 65)
- Education: University of Pennsylvania

Alice Eleanor Jones Nearing (30 March 1916 – 6 November 1981) was an American science fiction writer and journalist.

== Biography ==
Jones was born on 30 March 1916 in Philadelphia, to Henry Stayton Jones and Lucy A. Jones (née Schuler). Her father was a photoengraver for a publishing firm. She had one sister. Jones got her bachelor's degree from the University of Pennsylvania in 1936 and her Ph.D. in English literature from the same university in 1944. She married another graduate student and speculative fiction author Homer Nearing Jr. and they moved to Swarthmore, Pennsylvania. The couple had two sons, Geoffrey and Gregory.

Jones had a long career in publishing for a number of magazines including Redbook, Ladies’ Home Journal, The Saturday Evening Post, Woman’s Day, American Girl, and Seventeen. She published articles which were both fiction and nonfiction. She wrote for these journals until the 1960s. During 1955 she published briefly in genre magazines and her work has since been reissued by Strange Horizons. Her work is recognized for its strong feminist tones. For example, in "Created he Them," Jones focus on women's perspective "merges contemporary understandings of nuclear war with the maternalist sensibilities of women's peace activism" according to Lisa Yaszsek.

== Selected works ==
=== Chapbooks ===
- The Happy Clown, (2019)

=== Short fiction ===
- Life, Incorporated, (1955) published in Fantastic Universe Science Fiction magazine~April 1955
- Created He Them, (1955) published in The Magazine of Fantasy and Science Fiction, June 1955
- Miss Quatro, (1955) published in Fantastic Universe, June 1955
- Recruiting Officer, (1955) published in Fantastic, October 1955
- The Happy Clown, (1955) published in If, December 1955
