= The Ablest Man in the World =

- Short story by Edward Page Mitchell
- Country: United States
- Language: English
- Genre: Science fiction

Publication
- Published in: The Sun
- Publication type: Periodical
- Media type: Newspaper
- Publication date: May 4, 1879

"The Ablest Man in the World" is a short story by American journalist and author Edward Page Mitchell. It was written in 1879 and published unattributed on page two of the New York Sun on May 4 of that year. It was reprinted in Stories by American Authors, Vol. 10. in 1884. It was later included in the modern collection The Crystal Man: Stories by Edward Page Mitchell, edited by Sam Moskowitz in 1973.

== Plot summary ==
Dr. Fisher (not an MD) is spending his July holiday in Baden-Baden. While there, he is informed by one of the hotel staff that Baron Savitch, a rising Russian politician, is ill. Fisher is led into the baron's room where he finds the baron ill and shaking, and serves him some Bourbon, which makes things first better, then worse. Fisher notices that the baron's head is somewhat peculiar. The baron's head has a black silk skullcap which Fisher removes and finds the top of the baron's head to be a silver dome. The baron tells him to unscrew it but before he can, Dr. Rapperschwyll, the baron's doctor, comes in and tells Fisher to get out.

There is a lot of controversy surrounding Savitch, mostly concerning his humble beginnings to his rise in the Tsar's court after graduating from the Imperial University of Dorpat. Wanting to know more, Fisher confronts Rapperschwyll at an old observation tower when the ladder falls and they find themselves trapped up there for hours. Rapperschwyll, after swearing Fisher to secrecy, tells him the story of Baron Savitch.

Baron Savitch grew up in a mental asylum and was mute and retarded. Rapperschwyll found him there one day and, with his skill in medicine and watchmaking, made a clockwork brain for Savitch which is explicitly superior to Charles Babbage's difference engine. With this mechanical brain, Baron Savitch cannot make a mistake and with time will rise to become the next Napoleon.

Later in Paris, Fisher finds Baron Savitch on a diplomatic mission. He learns Savitch will soon marry and is disgusted by the idea of a woman being married to a machine. He finds that Rapperschwyll has returned to his native Switzerland, visiting his dying mother. With this knowledge, Fisher waits for the baron to feel ill again after a second serving of Bourbon. Once that has happened Fisher comes to his aid as a doctor. With the baron's guard down, Fisher takes his brain, runs off with it and later throws it into the Atlantic Ocean on his return trip to America.

== References in modern culture ==
- During the March 31, 2014 episode of the CBS television series Intelligence, it was revealed that the secret government "Clockwork Project" in that series—where the main character has a microchip implanted in his brain—was named after Baron Savitch's clockwork brain.
