= Moscow Institute of Electronics and Mathematics =

Institute in Moscow

Coordinates: 55°45′19″N 37°38′47″E

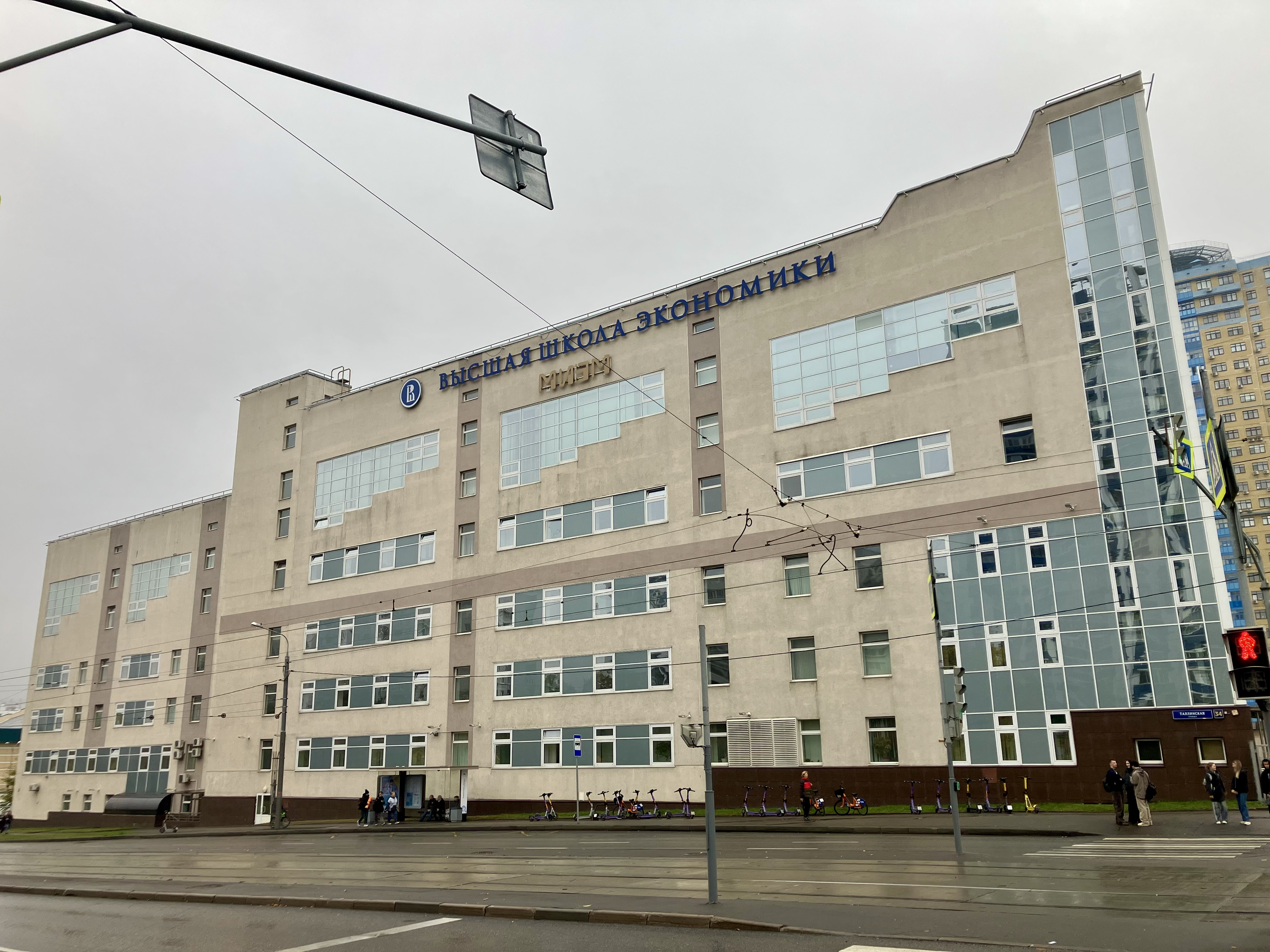
- Established: 1962
- Location: Moscow, Russia
- Website: miem.hse.ru

Moscow Institute of Electronics and Mathematics (MIEM; Russian: Московский институт электроники и математики НИУ ВШЭ, МИЭМ; also occasionally referred to as Moscow Institute of Electronic Engineering) — a Russian higher educational institution in the field of electronics, computer engineering, and applied mathematics.

== History ==
The institute was founded by the joint decree of the Communist Party Central Committee and the USSR government of 21 April 1962 as the Moscow Institute of Electronic Machine Building (Russian: Московский институт электронного машиностроения, МИЭМ) from the Moscow Evening Machine Building Institute (Russian: Московский вечерний машиностроительный институт (founded in 1929). It was designed to educate personnel for the technologically advanced enterprises of the USSR's military industry. The institute changed over to the current name in 1993, retaining the same abbreviation.

In 2011, the institute was incorporated into the National Research University Higher School of Economics. In December 2014, the institute moved to a new building located in the northwestern suburb of Moscow, Strogino, from its previous location at 3 Tryokhsvyatitelskiy lane in central Moscow.

== Faculties ==
As of 2015, the institute has 3 departments:

- Faculty of Electronic Engineering;
- Faculty of Computer Engineering;
- Faculty of Applied Mathematics.

== See also ==
- National Research University of Electronic Technology, another Russian technical institute founded in 1960s within the scope of the Soviet microelectronics program
