= Theoni Pappas =

American mathematics teacher and author

- Born: 1944 (age 81–82)
- Education: University of California, Berkeley; Stanford University

Theoni Pappas (born 1944) is an American mathematics teacher known for her books and calendars concerning popular mathematics.

Pappas is a graduate of the University of California, Berkeley, and earned a master's degree at Stanford University. She became a high school mathematics teacher in 1967.

She is the author of books including:

- Mathematics Appreciation (1986)
- The Joy of Mathematics (1986)
- Greek Cooking for Everyone (with Elvira Monroe, 1989)
- Math Talk: Mathematical Ideas in Poems for Two Voices (1991)
- More Joy of Mathematics: Exploring Mathematics All around You (1991)
- Fractals, Googols, and Other Mathematical Tales (1993)
- The Magic of Mathematics: Discovering the Spell of Mathematics (1994)
- The Music of Reason: Experience the Beauty of Mathematics through Quotations (1995)
- Math for Kids & Other People Too! (1997)
- The Adventures of Penrose: The Mathematical Cat (1997)
- Mathematical Scandals (1997)
- Math-a-Day: A Book of Days for Your Mathematical Year (1999)
- Mathematical Footprints: Discovering Mathematical Impressions All around Us (1999)
- Math Stuff (2002)
- Further Adventures of Penrose the Mathematical Cat (2004)
- Mathematical Snippets: Exploring Mathematical Ideas in Small Bites (2008)
- Numbers and Other Math Ideas Come Alive (2012)
- Do the Math! Math Challenges to Exercise Your Mind (2015)
- More Math Adventures with Penrose the Mathematical Cat (2017)
- Mathematical Journeys: Math Ideas and the Secrets They Hold (2021)

Additionally, she has written a series of annual mathematics calendars in various editions.
