= Edward Page Mitchell =

American novelist

- Photograph by Pirie MacDonald
- Born: March 24, 1852; Bath, Maine, US
- Died: January 22, 1927 (aged 74); New London, Connecticut, US
- Occupations: Editor; writer; journalist
- Writing career
- Genre: Science fiction

Edward Page Mitchell (1852–1927) was an American editorial and short story writer for The Sun, a daily newspaper in New York City. He became that newspaper's editor in 1897, succeeding Charles Anderson Dana. Mitchell was recognized as a major figure in the early development of the science fiction genre. Mitchell wrote fiction about a man rendered invisible by scientific means ("The Crystal Man", published in 1881) before H. G. Wells's The Invisible Man, wrote about a time-travel machine ("The Clock That Went Backward") before Wells's The Time Machine, wrote about faster-than-light travel ("The Tachypomp"; now perhaps his best-known work) in 1874, a thinking computer and a cyborg in 1879 ("The Ablest Man in the World"), and also wrote the earliest known stories about matter transmission or teleportation ("The Man Without a Body", 1877) and a superior mutant ("Old Squids and Little Speller"). "Exchanging Their Souls" (1877) is one of the earliest fictional accounts of mind transfer / body swap. Mitchell retired in 1926, a year before dying of a cerebral hemorrhage.

The gradual rediscovery of Mitchell and his work is a direct result of the publication in 1973 of a book-length anthology of his stories, compiled by Sam Moskowitz with a detailed introduction by Moskowitz giving much information about Mitchell's personal life. Because Mitchell's stories were not by-lined on original publication, nor indexed, Moskowitz expended major effort to track down and collect these works by an author whom Moskowitz cited as "the lost giant of American science fiction".

Mitchell's stories show the strong influence of Edgar Allan Poe. Among other traits, Mitchell shares Poe's habit of giving a basically serious and dignified fictional character a humorous name, such as "Professor Dummkopf" in Mitchell's "The Soul Spectroscope" and "The Man Without a Body". Since Mitchell's fictions were originally published in newspapers, typeset in the same format as news articles and not identified as fiction, he may possibly have used this device to signal to his readers that this text should not be taken seriously.

== Mitchell's life and work ==
Mitchell in 1872

Mitchell was born in Bath, Maine, the home of his maternal grandparents. Mitchell's family were wealthy at the time of his birth. When he was eight years old, his parents moved with him to New York City, to a house on Fifth Avenue directly across from the future site of the New York Public Library's main branch. His family were Congregationalists.

In 1863 he witnessed the Draft Riots, later describing them in his memoirs. In the aftermath of the bloody riots, Mitchell's father moved the family to Tar River, North Carolina. While living there, as a boy of fourteen, young Mitchell's letters to The Bath Times (his birthplace's local paper) were his first published writing.

The one great personal tragedy of Mitchell's life was a bizarre accident in 1872, when he was twenty years old. On a train journey from Bowdoin College to Bath, Maine, a hot cinder from the engine's smokestack flew in through the window and struck Mitchell's left eye, blinding it. After several weeks, while doctors attempted to restore this eye's sight, Mitchell's uninjured right eye suddenly underwent sympathetic blindness, rendering him completely blind. His burnt left eye eventually healed and regained its sight, but his uninjured right eye remained blind. The blind eye was later removed surgically, and replaced with a prosthetic glass eye. While recovering from this surgery, Mitchell wrote his story "The Tachypomp".

Mitchell first became a professional journalist at the Daily Advertiser in Boston, Massachusetts, where his mentor was Edward Everett Hale, now also recognized as an early author of science fiction.

Mitchell had a lifelong interest in the supernatural and paranormal, and several of his early newspaper pieces are factual investigations of alleged hauntings, usually determined (by Mitchell) to have a normal explanation. Mitchell later interviewed and befriended Madame Blavatsky, the well-known alleged psychic, yet he considered her a fraud despite their friendship.

Mitchell's entree to The Sun, where he eventually found long-term employment, was his ghost story "Back from that Bourne". Fiction published as fact, this purported to be the true account of a recently deceased resident of Maine returning as a ghost. One of Mitchell's later stories, "An Uncommon Sort of Spectre", is one of fiction's earliest examples of a ghost from the future. Many of Mitchell's fictions—published originally as factual newspaper articles—deal with ghosts or other supernatural events, and would now be considered works of fantasy rather than science fiction.

Mitchell often inserted more than one innovative concept into a science-fiction tale. His 1879 story "The Senator's Daughter", set in the future year 1937, contains several technological predictions which were daring for the time: travel by pneumatic tube, electrical heating, newspapers printed in the home by electrical transmission, food-pellet concentrates, international broadcasts, and the suspended animation of a living human being through freezing (cryogenics). This same story contains several social predictions: votes for American women, a war between the United States and China (with China winning), and interracial marriage.

Mitchell later in life

In 1874, Mitchell married Annie Sewall Welch. During the early years of Mitchell's tenure at the Sun, they lived in an apartment on Madison Avenue, where the marriage produced two sons. (The second son was born during a visit to relatives in Bath, Maine.) The need for larger quarters brought the couple to Bloomfield, New Jersey, where they lived while their next two sons were born. By all accounts, Mitchell's family life was happy. One of Mitchell's colleagues at the Sun was that paper's night editor Garrett P. Serviss, who would also become an important figure in early science fiction. Mitchell was a longtime resident of Glen Ridge, New Jersey and is credited with founding the community: he moved to this region when it was comparatively unpopulated, and his local influence led others to build houses there.

On July 20, 1903, Mitchell became editor-in-chief of the New York Sun, at that time the leading newspaper in the United States. In 1912, following his first wife's death, he married Ada M. Burroughs; this marriage produced a fifth son. Mitchell remained a popular and respected figure in American journalism until his death of a cerebral hemorrhage in New London, Connecticut. He was buried in his beloved Glen Ridge. During his lifetime, his journalism paid him well, and he clearly had no desire for public recognition, since he had many opportunities to achieve this yet never attempted to do so.

== In popular culture ==
Mitchell was portrayed by actor Ed Asner in the 1991 made-for-TV movie Yes, Virginia, There Is a Santa Claus, based on the famous editorial article "Is There a Santa Claus?" which appeared in The Sun while Mitchell was editor.

== Bibliography ==
=== Short stories ===
With the exception of "The Tachypomp", which was published in Scribner's Monthly, all stories were published in The Sun.

Title	Venue	Date
"The Tachypomp"	Scribner's Monthly	March 1874
"Back from that Bourne"	The Sun	December 19, 1874
"The Story of the Deluge"	The Sun	April 29, 1875
"The Soul Spectroscope"	The Sun	December 19, 1875
"The Inside of the Earth"	The Sun	February 27, 1876
"The Man Without a Body"	The Sun	March 25, 1877
"The Case of the Dow Twins"	The Sun	April 8, 1877
"Exchanging Their Souls"	The Sun	April 22, 1877
"The Cave of the Splurgles"	The Sun	July 29, 1877
"An Extraordinary Wedding"	The Sun	January 6, 1878
"The Devilish Rat"	The Sun	January 27, 1878
"The Pain Epicures"	The Sun	August 25, 1878
"The Terrible Voyage of the Toad"	The Sun	October 20, 1878
"The Devil's Funeral"	The Sun	March 16, 1879
"An Uncommon Sort of Spectre"	The Sun	March 30, 1879
"The Ablest Man in the World"	The Sun	May 4, 1879
"The Senator's Daughter"	The Sun	July 27, 1879
"The Facts in the Ratcliff Case"	The Sun	November 16, 1879
"The Professor's Experiment"	The Sun	February 22, 1880
"Our War With Monaco"	The Sun	March 7, 1880
"The Crystal Man"	The Sun	January 30, 1881
"The Clock That Went Backward"	The Sun	September 18, 1881
"The Wonderful Corot"	The Sun	December 4, 1881
"The Last Cruise of the Judas Iscariot"	The Sun	April 16, 1882
"The Balloon Tree"	The Sun	February 25, 1883
"The Flying Weathercock"	The Sun	April 13, 1884
"The Legendary Ship"	The Sun	May 17, 1885
"Old Squids and Little Speller"	The Sun	July 19, 1885
"A Day Among the Liars"	The Sun	August 23, 1885
"The Shadow on the Fancher Twins"	The Sun	January 17, 1886
