= Clifton Fadiman =

American radio and television personality (1904–1999)

- Born: Clifton Paul Fadiman; May 15, 1904; Brooklyn, New York, US
- Died: June 20, 1999 (aged 95); Sanibel, Florida, US
- Education: Columbia University
- Occupations: Intellectual, author, editor, radio and television personality
- Years active: 1927–1998
- Employer(s): Simon & Schuster, New Yorker
- Known for: Information, Please! (radio)
- Notable work: Lifetime Reading Plan, The Mathematical Magpie, Fantasia Mathematica (books)
- Television: This Is Show Business, The Name's the Same
- Spouses: Pauline Rush (m. 1927; div. 1949); Annalee Jacoby (m. 1950)
- Children: 3, including Anne Fadiman
- Relatives: Boris Sidis (uncle); William James Sidis (cousin)
- Awards: Medal for Distinguished Contribution to American Letters

Clifton Paul "Kip" Fadiman (May 15, 1904 – June 20, 1999) was an American intellectual, author, editor, and radio and television personality. He began his work in radio, and switched to television later in his career.

== Background ==
Born in Brooklyn, New York, Fadiman was a nephew of the émigré Ukrainian psychologist Boris Sidis and a first cousin of the child prodigy William James Sidis. Fadiman grew up in Brooklyn. His mother worked as a nurse; his father, Isadore, immigrated from Russian empire in 1892 and worked as a druggist.

Fadiman attended Columbia College at Columbia University. One of his teachers was lifelong friend Mark Van Doren; his undergraduate contemporaries included Jacques Barzun, Mortimer Adler, Lionel Trilling, Herbert Solow, Arthur F. Burns, Frank S. Hogan, Louis Zukofsky, and Whittaker Chambers. Although he entered with the Class of 1924, his graduation was delayed until 1925 because of financial constraints. Chambers clearly includes Fadiman in a group of ernste Menschen ["serious people"], whose ability to attend Columbia he attributes to "a struggle with a warping poverty impossible for those who have not glimpsed it to imagine it." He graduated Phi Beta Kappa. Fadiman had ambitions to become a scholar, but at graduation, the chairman of the English Department told him, "We have room for only one Jew, and we have chosen Mr. Trilling."

== Career ==
After graduation from Columbia, Fadiman taught English at the Ethical Culture High School (now known as the "Fieldston School") in the Bronx from 1925 to 1927.

=== Literature ===
In the late 1920s and early 1930s, Fadiman worked for Simon & Schuster, ending as its chief editor. At his interview with Max Schuster (a fellow alumnus of Columbia), Fadiman pulled out a folder with a hundred ideas for books. Among Fadiman's original one hundred was to turn Robert Ripley's newspaper cartoon, Believe it or Not! into book form. The series has gone on to sell over 30 million copies. While at Simon & Schuster, he started the translation career of Whittaker Chambers by having him translate Bambi from German:

My college friend, Clifton Fadiman, was then [circa 1927–1928] a reader at Simon and Schuster, the New York book publishers. He offered to let me try my hand at translating a little German book. It was about a deer named Bambi and was written by an Austrian, of whom I had never heard, named Felix Salten ... Bambi was an instant success, and I suddenly found myself an established translator.

In the September 1932 issue of New Masses (shortly after Chambers left the magazine to begin his underground career), Fadiman contributed with sixteen other prominent writers to the Symposium "How I Came to Communism." He wrote: "History–mainly in the form of the crisis–became my teacher while I was still young enough to learn."

Fadiman then took charge of The New Yorker's book review section, 1933–1943. He became emcee for the National Book Award ceremonies in 1938 and 1939, at least, and again when those literary awards by the American book industry were re-inaugurated in 1950. The awards were inaugurated May 1936, conferred annually through 1942 (publication years 1935 to 1941), and re-inaugurated March 1950 (publication year 1949). Fadiman became a judge for the Book of the Month Club in 1944. In the 1970s, he was also senior editor of Cricket magazine, where he wrote the book review column for children, "Cricket's Bookshelf".

=== Radio ===
While still at the New Yorker, Fadiman became well known on radio, where he hosted a popular quiz show, Information, Please! from May 1938 to June 1948. A regular trio of pundits, Franklin P. Adams, John Kieran, and Oscar Levant, plus one guest expert, conducted each session under Fadiman's control. Guest John Gunther's mention of the then-current Iranian potentate prompted Fadiman to ask, "Are you shah of that?", to which Gunther quipped, "Why, sultanly!" Fadiman also made frequent appearances on the Metropolitan Opera radio broadcasts from 1949 to 1960. During the intermission segments he would discuss the opera being broadcast and interview famous opera singers. Fadiman also hosted the show Conversation in the 1950s.

=== Television ===
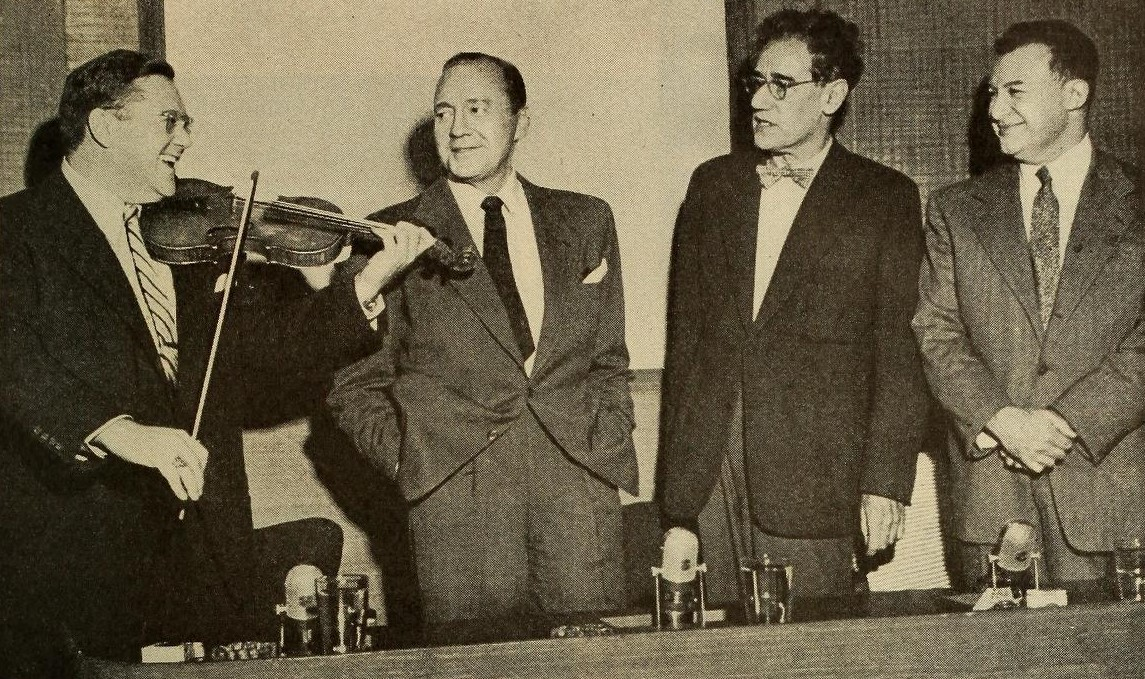
Fadiman (right) with Sam Levenson, Jack Benny and George S. Kaufman (1952)

In 1952, Information Please! was briefly revived for CBS Television as a 13-week summer replacement for the musical variety program The Fred Waring Show. During that June–September period, devoted fans of the departed radio program could finally not only hear, but also see Fadiman, Adams, and Kieran in action. His longest-lasting TV program was This Is Show Business, which ran on CBS from July 15, 1949, to March 9, 1954. Called This Is Broadway during the first four months of its run, the show mixed song, dance, and other musical entertainment, with information. Host Fadiman, celebrity guest panelists, and regular raconteurs/intellectuals Kaufman, Abe Burrows, and Sam Levenson commented on the musical performers and chatted with them. In late September 1951, This Is Show Business became the first regular CBS Television series to be broadcast live from coast to coast. The continuing need in 1950s TV for summer series to replace live variety shows likewise brought this show back in 1956 for a 12-week period (June 26 – September 11). Fadiman and Burrows returned along with new panelists Walter Slezak and actress Jacqueline Susann, the future author of Valley of the Dolls. Susann's husband, TV executive Irving Mansfield, produced the 1956 revival for NBC television.

Fadiman was also the last master of ceremonies to host the ABC-TV game show The Name's the Same. Robert Q. Lewis had presided for three years until the show was temporarily canceled. When it returned eight weeks later, Lewis was no longer available so producers Mark Goodson and Bill Todman hired different hosts for the final 39-episode cycle: Dennis James for 18 weeks, then Bob and Ray for 10 weeks, and then Fadiman for the remaining 11 weeks. The series, broadcast live, featured namesakes of celebrities and other "famous names". On August 16, 1955, when a woman contestant was discovered to be "Hope Diamond", Fadiman personally orchestrated an astounding surprise: he arranged for the real 45-carat Hope Diamond to be displayed to the amazed panelists and the national television audience. Chico Marx teased the audience as the show began: he had the diamond in his pocket. Fadiman committed an unfortunate faux pas when he asked Chico, "Are you working, or are you still living on Groucho's money?" Chico, taken aback, replied, "Groucho's money I have never seen."

Fadiman filled in for What's My Line? host John Charles Daly for two weeks in 1958 when Daly was on assignment in Tokyo.

=== Influence ===
Fadiman in 1973

Fadiman's witticisms and sayings were frequently printed in newspapers and magazines. "When you reread a classic, you do not see more in the book than you did before, you see more in you than there was before", was one of the better known. Of Stendhal, Fadiman wrote, "He has no grace, little charm, less humor ... [and] is not really a good storyteller". With the advent of TV, Fadiman gained in popularity, quickly establishing himself as an all-purpose, highly knowledgeable guest and host. At ease in front of the TV camera and experienced from his years in radio, he frequently appeared on talk shows and hosted a number of upscale quiz programs.

Fadiman became a prime example of the "witty intellectual" type popular on television in the 1950s. John Charles Daly, Bennett Cerf, George S. Kaufman, Alexander King, and a number of other television celebrities personified, along with Fadiman, the highly educated, elegant, patrician raconteurs and pundits regarded by TV executives of that era as appealing to the upper-class owners of expensive early TV sets.

== Awards ==
Fadiman received the Medal for Distinguished Contribution to American Letters from the National Book Foundation.

He received the Clarence Day Award from the American Library Association in 1969.

== Personal life ==
Fadiman's first marriage was in 1927 to Pauline Elizabeth Rush, with whom he had a son, Jonathan Rush. They divorced in 1949. His second marriage was in 1950 to Annalee Jacoby, aka Annalee Fadiman, an author, screenwriter for MGM and World War II foreign correspondent for Time and Life. As a widow, she later used the name Annalee Jacoby Fadiman. She co-wrote Thunder Out of China with Theodore H. White (1946). Clifton and Annalee had a son, Kim Fadiman, and a daughter, writer Anne Fadiman. On February 5, 2002, Annalee committed suicide in Captiva, Florida, aged 85, after a long battle with breast cancer and Parkinson's disease. Fadiman lost his eyesight when he was in his early 90s but continued to review manuscripts for the Book of the Month Club by listening to tapes of books recorded by his son Kim, after which Fadiman would dictate his impressions to his secretary.

== Death ==
Fadiman died at the age of 95 of pancreatic cancer on June 20, 1999, in Sanibel, Florida; he lived on nearby Captiva Island. In its obituary, The New York Times called Fadiman an "essayist, critic, editor and indefatigable anthologist whose encyclopedic knowledge made him a mainstay of Information Please and other popular radio programs in the late 1930s, 40s and 50s" and noted that he "also helped establish the Book-of-the-Month Club and served on its editorial board for more than 50 years." Two years before his death, a fourth edition of Fadiman's Lifetime Reading Plan was published as The New Lifetime Reading Plan.

== Works ==
The catalog of the Library of Congress has more than 90 works associated with Fadiman's name.

=== Translations from German ===
- Bloody poet; a novel about Nero, by Desider Kostolanyi, with a prefatory letter by Thomas Mann (1927)
- Ecce homo: and The Birth of Tragedy / by Friedrich Nietzsche (1927)
- Man who conquered death, by Franz Werfel (1927)

=== Books ===
- I Believe; the Personal Philosophies of Certain Eminent Men and Women of Our Time (1939)
- Books Are Weapons in the War of Ideas (1942)
- Party of One (1955)
- Any Number Can Play (1957)
- Fantasia Mathematica (1958, ed.)
- Lifetime Reading Plan (1960)
- The Mathematical Magpie (1962, ed.)
- Enter, Conversing (1962)
- Party of Twenty; Informal Essays from Holiday Magazine, Edited and with an introd. by Clifton Fadiman (1963)
- The Joys of Wine with Sam Aaron (1975)
- Empty Pages: A Search for Writing Competence in School and Society by Clifton Fadiman and James Howard; editor, Suzanne Lipset; cover design, William Nagel Graphic Design (1979?)

=== Children's collections and stories ===
- The Voyage of Ulysses (1959)
- The Adventures of Hercules (1960)
- Fireside Reader; an Assortment of Stories, Nonfiction, and Verses Chosen Especially for Reading Aloud (1961)
- The Story of Young King Arthur (1961)
- Wally the Wordworm (1964)
- A Visit from St. Nicholas: Facsimiles of the earliest printed newspaper and pamphlet versions and a holograph manuscript with a commentary by Clifton Fadiman (1967)
- Cricket's Choice, highlights from the magazine's first year edited by Clifton Fadiman and Marianne Carus, with a foreword by Fadiman (1974)
- The World Treasury of Children's Literature, selected and with commentary by Clifton Fadiman; with additional illustrations by Leslie Morril, in three volumes (1984)

=== Prefaces, introductions and/or editions or readers ===
- Voice of the City and Other Stories by O. Henry; a selection, with an introduction by Clifton Fadiman, with illustrations by George Grosz (1935)
- Ethan Frome by Edith Wharton; with water-colour drawings by Henry Varnum Poor and an introduction by Clifton Fadiman (1939, LCCN 39-4553)
- Reading I've Liked; a Personal Selection Drawn from Two Decades of Reading and Reviewing, presented with an informal prologue and various commentaries by Clifton Fadiman (1941)
- The Three Readers; an Omnibus of Novels, Stories, Essays & Poems Selected With Comments by the Editorial Committee of the Readers Club (1943)
- War and Peace by Leo Tolstoy, translated by Louise and Aylmer Maude with a foreword by Clifton Fadiman Simon and Schuster (1942)
- Short Stories of Henry James, selected and edited, with an introduction by Clifton Fadiman (1945, LCCN 45-9328)
- Collected Writings of Ambrose Bierce, with an introduction by Clifton Fadiman (1946)
- Posthumous Papers of the Pickwick Club, Including Three Little-Remembered Chapters from Master Humphrey's Clock in Which Mr. Pickwick, Sam Weller & Other Pickwickians Reappear, Edited, with an introd. by Clifton Fadiman. Illustrated by Frederick E. Banber (1949)
- The American Treasury, 1455–1955 (1955, ed.)
- Dionysus; a Case of Vintage Tales About Wine. Collected & Edited With an Introduction by Clifton Fadiman (1962)
- Five American Adventures (1963)
- Fifty Years; Being a Retrospective Collection of Novels, Novellas, Tales, Drama, Poetry, and Reportage and Essays (1965)
- Ecocide—and Thoughts Toward Survival with Jean White (1971)
- The People and Places Book (1974)
- The Little, Brown Book of Anecdotes, Clifton Fadiman, general editor (1985?)
- The World of the Short Story: A 20th Century Collection selected and edited by Clifton Fadiman (1986)
- Great Books of the Western World, Mortimer J. Adler, editor in chief; Clifton Fadiman, Philip W. Goetz, associate editors (1990)
- Living Philosophies: The Reflections of Some Eminent Men and Women of Our Time, edited by Clifton Fadiman (1990)
- The World Treasury of Modern Religious Thought, edited by Jaroslav Pelikan; with a foreword by Clifton Fadiman, general editor (1990)
- The World Treasury of Physics, Astronomy, and Mathematics, edited by Timothy Ferris; with a foreword by Clifton Fadiman, general editor (1991)
- Treasury of the Encyclopædia Britannica (1992, ed.)
- Foreword in Famous Last Words
- World Poetry: An Anthology of Verse from Antiquity to Our Time, Katharine Washburn and John S. Major, editors; Clifton Fadiman, general editor (1998)

=== Recordings ===
The Library of Congress has many recordings of Fadiman, which include:

- Prose and Poetry of England; Louis Untermeyer, editorial consultant; Clifton Fadiman, narrator (1964)
- The Snob and Name-Dropping (197?)
- They Don't Flush Toilets in Oedipus Rex (1973)
- Center Conversations: Clifton Fadiman Talks With Harvey Wheeler at Center for the Study of Democratic Institutions (1975)
- Battle of the Sexes (1975?)
- The Legacy of Inventions (1975?)

== Notes ==
Preceded by Bob Elliott and Ray Goulding	Host of The Name's the Same; June 28 - October 7, 1955	Succeeded by series canceled
