= List of time travel works of fiction =

Time travel is a common plot element in fiction. Works where it plays a prominent role are listed below. For stories of time travel in antiquity, see the history of the time travel concept.

== Literature and theater ==
This list describes novels and short stories in which time travel is central to the plot or the premise of the work. Works created prior to the 18th century are listed in Time travel § History of the concept.

Year	Title	Author(s)	Description
1733	Memoirs of the Twentieth Century	Samuel Madden	A guardian angel travels back to the year 1728, with letters from 1997 and 1998.
1771	L'An 2440, rêve s'il en fut jamais (Memoirs of the Year Two Thousand Five Hundred)	Louis-Sébastien Mercier	An unnamed man falls asleep and finds himself in a Paris of the future.
1781	Anno 7603	Johan Herman Wessel	A play in which a good fairy sends people forward to the year 7603 AD. The people find themselves in a society where gender roles are reversed and only women are soldiers.
1819	"Rip Van Winkle"	Washington Irving	Rip Van Winkle falls asleep on a mountainside and wakes twenty years in the future. In his absence, he has been forgotten, his wife has died, and his daughter is now an adult.
1838	"The Galoshes of Fortune"	Hans Christian Andersen	A short story in which a man unwittingly comes in possession of magic galoshes that grant any wish expressed by the person wearing them. The galoshes take him to 15th-century Copenhagen, then back to his own time.
1843	A Christmas Carol	Charles Dickens	The heartless Ebenezer Scrooge, an old miser, is visited by the ghost of his former business partner Jacob Marley and the Ghosts of Christmas Past, Present and Yet to Come, in order to teach him the consequences of his selfish ways.
1844	"A Tale of the Ragged Mountains"	Edgar Allan Poe	A short story in which the protagonist, Bedloe, claims to have been transported back to Benares in the 1780s.
1877	Newtonův mozek (Newton's Brain)	Jakub Arbes	In Arbes's story, the protagonist uses Newton's preserved brain to construct a device that allows him to journey through space and time, making it one of the earliest known examples of a time machine in literature.
1881	"The Clock That Went Backward"	Edward Page Mitchell	A clock takes people back in time. The first story to use a machine for time travel.
1887	El Anacronópete	Enrique Gaspar	An electrically powered machine takes Don Sindulfo García and his companions back to several places in history.
1887	Looking Backward: 2000–1887	Edward Bellamy	In the late 19th century, Julian West falls into a deep, hypnosis-induced sleep and wakes 113 years later.
1888	A Dream of John Ball	William Morris	John Ball travels between medieval and contemporary worlds.
1888	"The Chronic Argonauts"	H. G. Wells	An inventor takes a companion in his time machine. The companion narrates the story of their subsequent adventures.
1889	Sylvie and Bruno	Lewis Carroll	A watch both tells and determines time.
1889	A Connecticut Yankee in King Arthur's Court	Mark Twain	A man of the 19th century travels back to 528 AD in King Arthur's time.
1889	New Amazonia: A Foretaste of the Future	Elizabeth Burgoyne Corbett	The book's female narrator wakes up in the year 2472 to find that a highly evolved society of "Amazonian" women have turned Ireland into a utopian society where women dominate over men.
1891	Tourmalin's Time Cheques	Thomas Anstey Guthrie	The protagonist is able to 'bank time' during periods of boredom, and recover it again on presentation of a cheque to a clock. The first story to address the logical paradoxes inherent in the concept of time travel.
1892	Golf in the Year 2000	J. McCullough	A man falls asleep in 1892 and wakes up in the year 2000. Trains are supersonic, and golf and politics are the only activities not yet dominated by masculinized women.
1895	The Time Machine	H. G. Wells	An inventor creates a time machine and travels to the year 802,701 AD., where humans have evolved into two species, Morlocks and Eloi.
1904	The Defence of Duffer's Drift	Ernest Swinton	A military tactics manual, framed as a series of six dreams by "Lieutenant Backsight Forethought" about the defence of a river crossing in the Boer War. He learns something from each successive disaster before emerging successful in the final defence.
1905	Sultana's Dream	Rokeya Sakhawat Hossain	A feminist utopia called Ladyland in which women run everything and men are secluded, in a mirror-image of traditional purdah. Women scientists have discovered how to control weather and tap solar power for "electrical" technology which enables flying cars and laborless farming.
1906	The Story of the Amulet	E. Nesbit	A mysterious artifact brings British children to Babylon, Roman Gaul and other ancient civilizations, and to a future British utopia.
1909	Beatrice the Sixteenth	Irene Clyde	A time traveller discovers a lost world, which is an egalitarian utopian postgender society.
1919	"Enoch Soames"	Max Beerbohm	A short story in which Enoch is transported forward from 1897 to 1997 to find out whether he became a great writer. His tale involves a Faustian pact.
1920	The Excursions of Mr. Brouček to the Moon and to the 15th Century	Leoš Janáček	An opera based on satirical novels by Svatopluk Čech from 1888, in one of which a heavy-drinking bourgeois 19th-century Prague landlord finds himself transported to 1420 in the middle of the Hussite Wars.
1928 / 1929	Armageddon 2419 A.D.	Philip Francis Nowlan	A novella in which a strange cave gas transports Anthony Rogers to 2419 AD. This story was the basis of the comic strip Buck Rogers.
1929	The Bedbug	Mayakovsky	A satirical play in which a worker frozen for fifty years is revived in 1979 and finds himself in a communist utopia in which he does not fit, and so becomes a specimen in a zoo showing the vices of the past.
1933	The Man Who Awoke	Laurence Manning	Norman Winters puts himself into suspended animation for 5,000 years at a time.
1935	The Box of Delights	John Masefield	A magical box allows the Kay Harker to shrink in size, fly, and go into the past.
1936	"The Shadow Out of Time"	H. P. Lovecraft	The Great Race of Yith is an extraterrestrial species whose members move vast distances through space and time for historical studies by imposing involuntary body swaps on other beings, a process tantamount to spiritual possession.
1939	Lest Darkness Fall	L. Sprague de Camp	An archaeologist is transported from Rome, in the time of Mussolini, back to the 6th century and tries to prevent the fall of the Ostrogothic Kingdom amid the Gothic War.
1941	By His Bootstraps	Robert A. Heinlein	A novella involving a circular paradox–a character is brought to the future, where he later operates a time machine to bring himself to the future.
1941	"The Seesaw"	A. E. van Vogt	A shop selling futuristic weapons appears in June 1947. A reporter enters the shop and finds himself 7,000 years in the future.
1943	"Mimsy Were the Borogoves"	Lewis Padgett (pseudonym of Henry Kuttner and C. L. Moore)	A scientist millions of years in the future, in two experiments with time machines, uses boxes of educational toys as test objects. One lands in the 19th century and influences Lewis Carroll's writing of the poem "Jabberwocky". The other arrives in 1942 and causes two children to develop parahuman abilities incomprehensible to their parents. The film The Last Mimzy was loosely based on the story.
1944	Future Times Three	René Barjavel	Scientists invent a substance which allows time travel. Future humanity has branched into species for different tasks; they also visit the past. The story was adapted into a film in 1982.
1946	Vintage Season	"Lawrence O'Donnell" (joint pseudonym of C. L. Moore and Henry Kuttner)	Time travellers from the future experience wonderful seasons and spectacular events in the past.
1950	Flight to Forever	Poul Anderson	A physicist is stuck in a time machine that only can travel forwards in time.
1950	Pebble in the Sky	Isaac Asimov	In the mid-twentieth century, a man who works as a retired tailor is accidentally sent to the future.
1951	The Gauntlet	Ronald Welch	After putting on a gauntlet, a boy is transported back to 1326 in Wales.
1952	"A Sound of Thunder"	Ray Bradbury	The butterfly effect means that changes made in the past will affect the future.
1953	Bring the Jubilee	Ward Moore	A time traveller from an alternate reality travels back to the Battle of Gettysburg and changes his own future into ours.
1954	Experiment	Fredric Brown	An experiment involving the time travel of a small brass cube results in disaster.
1954-1971	The Star Diaries	Stanisław Lem	A collection of short stories featuring the adventures of Ijon Tichy, several of which involve time travel.
1955	The End of Eternity	Isaac Asimov	Time guardians carry out "Reality Changes" to minimize human suffering, as integrated over the whole of (future) human history.
1955– 1995	Time Patrol, plus 10 others	Poul Anderson	A series of eleven stories about the Time Patrol, an organization which protects the past.
1956	"The Dead Past"	Isaac Asimov	A historian, a physicist, and a science writer break a bureaucratic monopoly on the chronoscope (a time viewer) by developing one independently, after which they soon learn why the device had been kept secret.
1956	"Extempore"	Damon Knight	Mankind learns how to travel through time.
1956	The Stars My Destination	Alfred Bester	Gully Foyle lives in a future where self-teleportation is common. He learns to teleport through time.
1957	Wythnos yng Nghymru Fydd (A Week in the Wales of the Future)	Islwyn Ffowc Elis	The narrator travels twice to Wales in the year 2033. Each time he encounters a different future. (in Welsh)
1957	The Door into Summer	Robert A. Heinlein	A man has been trapped in suspended animation for thirty years. After his release, he uses a time machine to travel back in time and exact revenge on his friend and his fiancée who stole his business.
1957	"The Last Word"	Damon Knight	A tale of Armageddon and the Devil.
1957	"Soldier from Tomorrow"	Harlan Ellison	A soldier travels back in time from the future to warn the world of its path towards global conflict.
1958	The Big Time	Fritz Leiber	Two time-traveling factions, the "Spiders" and the "Snakes", wage a temporal war, trying to change events throughout history.
1958	"The Men Who Murdered Mohammed"	Alfred Bester	A professor travels back in time and kills his wife's grandfather so that his wife will never have existed. However, the results confound him.
1958	Tom's Midnight Garden	Philippa Pearce	A children's novel in which a boy is living in medical quarantine in a 1950s apartment building. He finds himself in the building's garden of the 1880s and befriends a girl who he plays with.
1958	The Time Traders	Andre Norton	A team travels to 2,000 BC where they find a Soviet base that transfers them further back in time. There they have to avoid both the Soviets and malevolent aliens.
1959	Galactic Derelict	Andre Norton	Using the information learned in The Time Traders, a team travels 10,000 years into the past to retrieve a crashed alien spacecraft, accidentally triggering its autopilot when they return it to the present.
1959	Cities in Flight: A Clash of Cymbals/The Triumph of Time	James Blish	Faced with the impending end of the universe, physicists develop a grain of sodium chloride that travels backwards in time, creating it moments after the universe's end, and then trapping it when it reaches the present in order to study conditions in the future.
1959	"'—All You Zombies—'"	Robert A. Heinlein	A short story involving a circular paradox, in which a man discovers that he is his own mother and father.
1959–1989	The Time Machine series	"Donald Keith" alias of Donald and Keith Monroe	Series of 23 short stories published in Boys' Life magazine centered around a patrol of Boy Scouts who acquire an abandoned time machine.
1961	Danny Dunn, Time Traveler	Raymond Abrashkin and Jay Williams	Two teenagers use their professor's time machine to study the history of the United States.
1962	A Wrinkle in Time	Madeleine L'Engle	Thirteen-year-old Meg Murry, her younger brother Charles Wallace Murry, and her friend Calvin O'Keefe set out on a journey through time and space to rescue her missing father. It is the first book in L'Engle's Time Quintet and the basis for the 2018 film of the same name.
1962	Escape Attempt	Strugatsky Brothers	A time slip novel where two youths in the 22nd century encounter a mysterious man who turns out to be a Soviet WWII soldier.
1962 / 1969	Times Without Number	John Brunner	A time traveler from an alternative world fails to prevent an alteration in the timeline, which leaves him in the present in a world (ours or at least like it) where time travel is unknown. He decides to keep the knowledge of time travel secret and accept his exile.
1963–present	Doctor Who	various authors	A popular science fiction television show, Doctor Who gave rise to more than 530 original novels and novelizations based on the series.
1964	Farnham's Freehold	Robert A. Heinlein	A direct hit by a nuclear missile sends a bomb shelter with Hugh Farnham, a middle-aged white man, and others into a post-apocalyptic future where a black culture enslaves and cannibalizes white people. Farnham and another survivor are sent back to their own time in a time-travel experiment. They arrive in a world subtly different from the one they left and spend the rest of their lives trying to prevent the series of events leading to the future they had seen.
1964	The Great Time Machine Hoax	Keith Laumer	A man inherits his uncle's mansion, which has a computer that can function as a time machine, although they are slow to realize it.
1965	The Ship that Sailed the Time Stream	G.C. Edmondson	A US Navy research ship accidentally travels back in time. The book was nominated for the Nebula Award, but lost to Dune.
1965 / 1967	The Girl Who Leapt Through Time	Yasutaka Tsutsui	A high-school girl accidentally acquires the ability to travel through time, which leads to her reliving multiple time loops.
1967	Jessamy	Barbara Sleigh	A children's mystery set in England where the main protagonist travels to the time of World War I.
1967	The Technicolor Time Machine	Harry Harrison	A bankrupt film studio and a mediocre film director make a film about the founding of Vinland. Using a time travel machine, they cast real Vikings.
1968	Hawksbill Station	Robert Silverberg	An oppressive government uses a time machine to deport their political prisoners to the Cambrian, a half-billion years in the past.
1968	The Last Starship from Earth	John Boyd	In an alternate universe, Jesus was not crucified and became a political agitator, overthrowing the Roman Empire by founding a theocratic government which still rules the world to this day. A mathematician is sent to the past under the name of "Judas Iscariot" in order to kill Jesus, resulting in the common history.
1968	Past Master	R. A. Lafferty	Members of a future society try to prevent its decline by bringing Sir Thomas More to the year 2535.
1969	Charlotte Sometimes	Penelope Farmer	A boarding-school story where the protagonist, Charlotte, travels back in time to be Claire in 1918.
1969	Slaughterhouse-Five	Kurt Vonnegut	A man is randomly travelling through time, jumping from one event to another in no particular order.
1969	Up the Line	Robert Silverberg	A guide takes tourists to view historical events in Constantinople.
1969	The House on the Strand	Daphne du Maurier	A drug-induced journey to a Cornish village in the 14th century.
1969	Behold the Man	Michael Moorcock	A man uses a time machine to travel to 28 AD, in the hope of meeting Jesus.
1970	Quest for the Future	A. E. van Vogt	A man once exposed to films from the future is drawn into an adventure to become part of a group of time travellers linked by a special building.
1970	Time and Again	Jack Finney	Hypnosis allows travel through time.
1970	The Year of the Quiet Sun	Wilson Tucker	A government uses a time machine to survey the future and adjust its policies accordingly.
1970	Tau Zero	Poul Anderson	The crew of a space colonization vessel aiming to reach a nearby star accidentally travels billions of years into the future due to runaway time dilation. The crew members realize that the universe is approaching a Big Crunch, and the universe collapses and then explodes in a new Big Bang. The voyagers then decelerate and finally disembark on a planet with a habitat suitably similar to Earth.
1971	Dinosaur Beach	Keith Laumer	Igor Ravel is an agent of Nexx Central, sent back in time to correct the mistakes of previous era time travelers. After a mission in the 20th century he arrives at Dinosaur Beach, an out of the way Nexx station in the Jurassic but the station is destroyed and Ravel, now trapped, needs to figure out who did it and how to escape.
1972	Time's Last Gift	Philip José Farmer	A pastiche wherein a future Tarzan, using the name John Gribardsun, orchestrates time-travel research allowing him to travel to 12,000 BC.
1972	There Will Be Time	Poul Anderson	A man is born with the innate ability to travel in time.
1973	The Dark Is Rising	Susan Cooper	In the second novel of The Dark Is Rising Sequence, Will Stanton joins Merriman Lyon to travel back in England's history, where he will read The Book of Gramarye, learn his powers as an Old One, and gather the Circle of Signs.
1973	Time Enough for Love	Robert A. Heinlein	Lazarus Long travels back in time to 1916 and falls in love with his own mother.
1973	The Man Who Folded Himself	David Gerrold	A man receives a belt that allows him to travel through time.
1973	Crusade in Jeans	Thea Beckman	14-year-old boy, stranded in the 13th century, saves the life of Leonardo Fibonacci. They join the Children's Crusade and save most of them with 20th-century knowledge and high technology, such as a box of matches.
1973	"12:01 P.M."	Richard A. Lupoff	Myron Castleman, an executive in New York City, finds that he is repeatedly reliving the same hour of the same day. His time loop starts at 12:01 PM and lasts until 1:00 PM, when he is returned to the same place where he began the hour.
1975	Bid Time Return	Richard Matheson	A young man sees an old photograph of a woman. Through hypnosis, he travels back from 1980 to 1912 to meet her. The story was the basis of the 1980 film Somewhere in Time.
1976	Woman on the Edge of Time	Marge Piercy	A woman of the 1970s who has been involuntarily committed to a mental institution is visited from the future by a time-traveling woman from the year 2137. The patient benefits from increasingly prolonged visits to this future society, where people have enormous individual freedom and are trained in self-control and other social-emotional skills.
1976	An Infinite Summer	Christopher Priest	Travelers from the future "freeze" small groups of people into "tableaux". The people in each tableau vivant become invisible and permeable to others, until the effect wears off, sometimes after many years.
1977	Rotating Cylinders and the Possibility of Global Causality Violation	Larry Niven	A half-finished Tipler cylinder is discovered by a future human explorer. When the leader decides to complete it, his civilization is destroyed by a nova.
1979	Roadmarks	Roger Zelazny	The protagonist and others travel on a highway that runs through time, connecting all times and possible histories.
1979	Time After Time	Karl Alexander	H. G. Wells builds a time machine, which is stolen by Jack the Ripper so he can escape the authorities and continue his killing spree in the future.
1979	Morlock Night	K. W. Jeter	The Morlocks from H. G. Wells' The Time Machine use the machine to travel back to Victorian London.
1979	Kindred	Octavia E. Butler	An African-American woman, inexplicably transported from 1976 Los Angeles to early 19th-century Maryland, meets her ancestors.
1980	The Number of the Beast	Robert A. Heinlein	Two couples, after getting married, travel in a space-time machine that can travel in the three normal spatial dimensions and in three distinct temporal dimensions. They encounter malevolent aliens, visit fictitious worlds such as Oz, and meet characters from Heinlein's other works.
1980	Timescape	Gregory Benford	Tachyons are used to warn scientists of the past about an upcoming disaster. Winner of several prestigious science fiction awards.
1980	Thrice Upon a Time	James P. Hogan	A scientist invents a machine that can send messages through time.
1980	A Rebel in Time	Harry Harrison	A racist US colonel plans to aid the Confederacy with submachine gun plans and is pursued through time by a black cop.
1980	The Restaurant at the End of the Universe	Douglas Adams	The Milliways' restaurant is frozen in the last moment before the universe succumbs to final entropy. Time travel is required to reach it.
1981	The Many-Colored Land, first book of the Saga of the Pliocene Exile series	Julian May	Time travellers from the late twenty-first to the early twenty-second century go through a one-way time portal to the Earth's Pliocene. The world is controlled by humanoid extraterrestrials.
1982	Life, the Universe and Everything	Douglas Adams	Time travel paradoxes form the basis of this broad comedy, as in the case of the ancient poet Lallafa.
1983	Millennium	John Varley	In the far distant future, a team of time travellers snatch the passengers of a crashed aeroplane, leaving behind prefabricated bodies for rescue teams to find. The novel is the basis of the 1989 film.
1983	The Anubis Gates	Tim Powers	In 1983, a millionaire discovers time-travel gates and organizes a trip to 1810 to attend a lecture given by Samuel Taylor Coleridge. A professor hired by the millionaire is trapped in 19th-century London.
1984	"The Toynbee Convector"	Ray Bradbury	A stagnating civilization of the 1980s is revitalized when a man produces evidence of a future utopia, obtained through time travel. Mankind is inspired by the evidence to achieve this utopia.
1984	Trojan Horse: Jerusalem	J. J. Benítez	The plot of the book unveils the last period in the life of Jesus Christ as revealed through the first-hand experience of two pilots, or rather "timenauts", members of a US Air Force top-secret military experimental project on time travel codenamed "Operation Trojan Horse", who in 1973 supposedly succeeded in travelling back in time to the land of Palestine in the year 30 A.D. A saga of, so far, 11 volumes, with the last one published in 2019.
1984	TimeWars series	Simon Hawke	12 books from 1984 to 1991 about a secret organization protecting history from change by time travelers. Many people and events we consider fictional are historical, and vice versa; the action of each book concerns the events of a famous work of literature. In the first, time travelers contesting the fate of Richard I of England become caught up in Walter Scott's Ivanhoe.
1985	The Proteus Operation	James P. Hogan	Decades after Axis victory in World War II, the besieged forces of freedom mount a covert military mission to 1939, to alter the outcome of the war.
1985	Eon	Greg Bear	Events in Eon take place in 2005, when the U.S. and Soviet Union are on the verge of nuclear war. In that tense political climate, a 290 km asteroid is detected. The humans who built the Stone seem to come from approximately 1,200 years in the future.
1986–2014	The Cross-Time Engineer series	Leo Frankowski	A 20th-century Polish engineer is transported back to 13th-century Poland, ten years before the Mongol invasion.
1987	Sphere	Michael Crichton	A man made space ship from the far future passes through a wormhole. It crashes onto the Earth, where it is thought to be an alien vessel.
1987	A Tale of Time City	Diana Wynne Jones	Vivian Smith, a girl who is kidnapped while being evacuated from London during World War II, is caught up in a struggle to preserve history.
1988	Replay	Ken Grimwood	In 1988, a man suffers a heart attack and finds himself returned to his life in 1963.
1988	Lightning	Dean Koontz	A time traveller from Nazi Germany interferes with the life of a young woman.
1988	The Devil's Arithmetic	Jane Yolen	During a Passover Seder, a woman is transported back to 1942 in Poland and is sent to a death camp.
1989	Hyperion	Dan Simmons	The Shrike is a great warrior who is sent back from the future for unknown reasons.
1989	"The Return of William Proxmire"	Larry Niven	William Proxmire enlists the help of a physicist to go back in time to cure Robert A. Heinlein's tuberculosis, expecting that Heinlein will not become a science-fiction writer, so not inspiring proponents of, in Proxmire's view money-wasting, space travel. The result is diametrically opposite to the expected.
1990	Four Past Midnight: "The Langoliers"	Stephen King	An airplane accidentally flies through a rip in the space-time continuum. It appears in the "used time" of yesterday, where dreadful "Langoliers" eat the past.
1991–ongoing	Outlander series	Diana Gabaldon	A woman time travels from the 1940s to the 1740s by stepping through the standing stones in Scotland.
1992	The Guns of the South	Harry Turtledove	During the American Civil War, South African white supremacists give AK-47s to the Confederacy.
1992	Doomsday Book	Connie Willis	A history student is inadvertently sent to 1348 England, at the beginning of the Black Death pandemic.
1995	The Hundred-Light-Year-Diary	Greg Egan	After the invention of a method for sending messages back in time, the history of the future becomes common knowledge, and every person knows their own fate.
1995	From Time to Time	Jack Finney	In this sequel to Time and Again, Simon Morley travels to the year 1911, to prevent World War I. Adventures include voyaging on the RMS Titanic.
1995	The Time Ships	Stephen Baxter	The authorised sequel to H. G. Wells' The Time Machine that picks up where the original left off. The Traveller returns to the future only to find that the Eloi are no longer part of the timeline and the Morlocks have an advanced civilization that has built a Dyson sphere around the Sun. The Traveller then goes back in time in order to fix what went wrong.
1996	Timequake	Kurt Vonnegut	In 2001, people are transported to 1991 to relive their lives.
1996	Pastwatch: The Redemption of Christopher Columbus	Orson Scott Card	Researchers look back in time to see Christopher Columbus's arrival in the New World, in order to save the world from ecological disaster.
1996	Animorphs	Katherine Applegate	Animorphs and Visser 3 are sent back a few hours to the Amazon by a Saurio Rip, with the plot used again in Altermorph 1. In Megamorph 2, the same concept is used to send the animorphs back to 65 million BC.
1996	Making History	Stephen Fry	Two men in the present attempt to prevent the birth of Adolf Hitler.
1996	The Dechronization of Sam Magruder	George Gaylord Simpson	Research chronologist Sam Magruder working in the year 2162 is accidentally transported 80 million years back in time to the late Cretaceous era and must learn to survive in a world of dinosaurs.
1997	In the Garden of Iden	Kage Baker	The first book of Baker's The Company series, all of which involve time travel.
1997	To Say Nothing of the Dog	Connie Willis	A comedy in which historians travel back in time to find an artifact for a wealthy woman. They experience the Blitz at St. Paul's Cathedral and travel the Thames as in Three Men in a Boat.
1997	Corrupting Dr. Nice	John Kessel	Modelled on 1930s screwball comedies; set in Cretaceous, 40 AD Jerusalem, and 2060 AD. Features a scene with a dinosaur in a hotel room.
1998	The Transall Saga	Gary Paulsen	A boy is transported to a weird world by a blue light, only to discover that it is the dark future of planet Earth.
1998	Island in the Sea of Time	S. M. Stirling	Nantucket is transported 3,000 years back in time because of a space disturbance.
1998	The Sterkarm Handshake	Susan Price	A 21st-century corporation intends to use a Time Tube to exploit the natural resources of the past, but is outfoxed by a 16th-century Scottish clan.
1999	King of Shadows	Susan Cooper	A modern-day boy switches places with a Shakespearean actor who needs to be cured by modern medicine so he can return to his own time and help Shakespeare to greater success on the stage.
1999	Timeline	Michael Crichton	Modern historians become stuck in the Middle Ages.
1999	Harry Potter and the Prisoner of Azkaban	J. K. Rowling	Hogwarts student Hermione Granger acquires a Time-Turner, which allows her to take a large courseload. The device is later used to manipulate the events of a single night to free two prisoners.
2000	The Light of Other Days	Arthur C. Clarke, Stephen Baxter	A wormhole-based "time viewer" can observe people and events from any point throughout time and space.
2000	1632	Eric Flint	A West Virginia mining town is sent back to the Thirty Years' War in Germany. First in the 1632 series.
2001	The Chronoliths	Robert Charles Wilson	Monuments from the future appear in the early 21st century, precipitating a global political collapse.
2001	Thief of Time	Terry Pratchett	Unfreezing and freezing of time using a small mechanism.
2002	Bones of the Earth	Michael Swanwick	Palaeontologists studying dinosaurs are trapped in the Mesozoic period, but also travel into the very distant future. The novel was nominated for several science fiction awards.
2002	Night Watch	Terry Pratchett	A man interacts with a younger version of himself.
2002	Counting Up, Counting Down	Harry Turtledove	Collection of short stories, including two about a man's attempt to save his failing marriage by travelling back to the time he first met his wife.
2002	Kaleidoscope Century	John Barnes	A man on Mars has a virus that puts him to sleep every 15 years, and he wakes 10 younger. He learns of a way to go back to the past.
2002	The Eyre Affair	Jasper Fforde	Thursday Next is caught up in overlapping vortices of time and alternate reality as a villain tries to eradicate a literary classic.
2003–2011	Haruhi Suzumiya	Nagaru Tanigawa	Mikuru Asahina and Fujiwara have travelled from the future to observe the titular girl, Haruhi Suzumiya, who is unaware that she possesses destructive reality warping powers.
2003	A Shortcut in Time	Charles Dickinson	A man in a small Illinois town is thrown fifteen minutes into the past, and a teenage girl arrives claiming to be from 1908.
2003	The Time Traveler's Wife	Audrey Niffenegger	A man with a rare genetic disorder unpredictably travels in time, living his life out of sequence.
2004	Axis of Time	John Birmingham	A naval task force from 2021 is accidentally sent back to just before the Battle of Midway.
2004	The Spark of God (orig. title: L'Éclat de Dieu)	Romain Sardou	Describes the First Crusade and the beginning of the Knights Templar in the future.
2004	All You Need Is Kill	Hiroshi Sakurazaka	When aliens invade, a new recruit dies on the battlefield, only to reawaken the day before he was killed and repeatedly fight and die.
2004	For Us, the Living: A Comedy of Customs	Robert A. Heinlein	Engineer and pilot Perry Nelson is killed in a car accident in 1939 and wakes up in another body in 2086. Heinlein could not find a publisher for this, his first book, written in 1938–39, during his lifetime. Many themes of his later writings are here in embryonic form.
2004–2005	Warcraft: War of the Ancients Trilogy	Richard A. Knaak	A human, a dragon and an orc travel back in time to help save Azeroth from the Burning Legion.
2005	Mammoth	John Varley	A multi-billionaire clones a mammoth and sends it back in time.
2006	The Plot to Save Socrates	Paul Levinson	Time travellers from 2042 try to prevent Socrates from consuming hemlock.
2006	Artemis Fowl: The Lost Colony	Eoin Colfer	The fifth in the Artemis Fowl series. Artemis and Captain Holly Short search for a missing demon, to stop a demon colony. Artemis also ends up saving Holly by manipulating time.
2007	Rant: An Oral Biography of Buster Casey	Chuck Palahniuk	Characters participate in "Party Crashing" which can, under certain conditions, cause time travel.
2007	The Accidental Time Machine	Joe Haldeman	A research assistant at the Massachusetts Institute of Technology accidentally creates a forward-traveling time machine. Each leap forward in time to get out of trouble only lands him in deeper trouble.
2008	Artemis Fowl: The Time Paradox	Eoin Colfer	The sixth book in the Artemis Fowl series. After his mother contracts spelltropy, Artemis travels back in time to find a lemur that can help cure her. The trick ending creates a circular timeline that started the series.
2008	Found	Margaret Peterson Haddix	Thirteen-year-olds Jonah and Chip find out that they are missing children from time and go on a journey, along with Jonah's sister, Katherine, to uncover secrets.
2009	Ruby Red (original title: Rubinrot)	Kerstin Gier	Gwendolyn Shepherd can travel in time with a machine called a chronograph.
2009	When You Reach Me	Rebecca Stead	Sixth-grader Miranda Sinclair becomes involved with time-traveller Marcus whose future self needs to give his past self notes on how to time travel in order to save a mutual friend's life. The notes are only addressed to "M", causing them to initially end up with Miranda instead of Marcus.
2009	Sent	Margaret Peterson Haddix	Jonah, Katherine, Chip and Alex are sent back to 1483 to learn that Chip is actually King Edward V and Alex is his brother Richard, Duke of York.
2009	Hero.com: Crisis Point	Andy Briggs	Time travellers can go back in time, but going to the future is impossible. They also cannot change the past lest this cause a paradox of retrocausality. The chief villain takes advantage of retrocausality by sending two characters into the past to enable him to escape from prison.
2009	Time Travelers Never Die	Jack McDevitt	Adrian "Shel" Shelborne receives a package from his mysteriously disappeared father, with four devices and a note instructing him to destroy them. Soon, Shel discovers that the devices can take one anywhere at any point in time.
2009	Frequently Asked Questions About Time Travel	Gareth Carrivick	Two avid science fiction fans and their friend attempt to navigate a time travel conundrum in the middle of a British pub, where they meet a girl from the future who sets the adventure in motion.
2009–present	Illumine Lingao (also known as Morning Star of Lingao)	Xiao Feng (principal author); collaboratively written.	Influential work of internet literature in China telling the story of 500 contemporary Chinese who travel to the late Ming period and seek to change history through industrialization and modernization.
2010	Sabotaged	Margaret Peterson Haddix	Jonah and Katherine go on a mission to return a missing child named Andrea, really Virginia Dare, to her time in the Roanoke Colony.
2010	Blackout and All Clear	Connie Willis	Historians from 2048 go to the London Blitz during World War II to observe and end up being part of it. A novel published in two parts.
2010	How to Live Safely in a Science Fictional Universe	Charles Yu	In search of his father, a time machine mechanic travels through time accompanied by TAMMY and his ontologically valid dog, Ed, all while documenting his travels in a manual for future travellers.
2011	Torn	Margaret Peterson Haddix	Jonah and Katherine are sent to Henry Hudson's ship in 1611, where they discover that events are playing out differently than they really did in history.
2011	11/22/63	Stephen King	A man travels through a time portal, and attempts to prevent the assassination of John F. Kennedy.
2012	Caught	Margaret Peterson Haddix	When an attempt to return Lieserl Einstein to time goes wrong, Jonah and Katherine must go back to 1903 in order to unfreeze time in the present.
2012	Amber House	Kelly Moore, Tucker Reed, Larkin Reed	A teenage girl uses psychometry to alter events in the past, changing the present and future.
2013	Captain Underpants and the Revolting Revenge of the Radioactive Robo-Boxers	Dav Pilkey	George Beard and Harold Hutchins, two fourth graders, use a homemade time machine to travel 65 million years into the past. They also travel to 206,784 years in the past and 30 years in the future.
2013	Red Dawn		First published on the literature web portal Zongheng, Red Dawn depicts a contemporary man who travels back to 1905 where he begins a Communist revolution earlier in China, using Maoist ideology and strategies. The text is widely discussed and debated online via websites like Zhihu.
2013	Risked	Margaret Peterson Haddix	Jonah, Katherine, and Chip are suddenly transported to 1918 and must try to save Anastasia and Alexei Romanov, even though their remains have been identified by modern-day scientists.
2013	The Shining Girls	Lauren Beukes	A mysterious drifter employs time travel to murder the titular "shining girls" and contends with one victim's attempts to expose him.
2013	The Chronicles of St Mary's	Jodi Taylor	Taylor's flagship series follows the staff of St Mary's Institute of Historical Research, especially historian Dr Madeleine "Max" Maxwell, as they time-travel to "investigate major historical events in contemporary time".
2014	Neverwas	Kelly Moore, Tucker Reed, Larkin Reed	An unforeseen change in the past necessitates the use of psychic abilities to reset the present and future.
2014	The First Fifteen Lives of Harry August	Catherine Webb	A man lives his life again and again from the beginning each time he dies. He finds more people like him in the Cronus club.
2014	Revealed	Margaret Peterson Haddix	When Charles Lindbergh kidnaps Katherine, the other children from the plane disappear, and the adults in his town de-age into children, Jonah must find a way to fix everything.
2015	A Long Time Until Now	Michael Z. Williamson	US soldiers on patrol in Afghanistan are transported in time to the Paleolithic era where they meet other temporally displaced soldiers.
2015	Redeemed	Margaret Peterson Haddix	After multiple timelines merge, Jonah has a new twin, Jordan, who accidentally sends himself, Jonah, and Katherine to the future.
2016	Harry Potter and the Cursed Child	Jack Thorne	A stage play in which the children of characters from the corresponding book series use a Time-Turner in an attempt to prevent the death of Cedric Diggory, which occurred in Harry Potter and the Goblet of Fire. Repeated attempts have increasingly worse repercussions for the future.
2017	All Our Wrong Todays	Elan Mastai	A man from a utopia in an alternate reality finds himself stuck in our reality after a time travel accident.
2017	The Rise and Fall of D.O.D.O.	Neal Stephenson, Nicole Galland	Members of a secret U.S. government Department of Diachronic Operations (D.O.D.O.) attempt to change history through time travel by the use of magic.
2018	Rewrite	Gregory Benford	After 48 year old Charlie Moment is killed in a car accident he wakes up back in time in his 16 year old body on his 16th birthday. Instead of reliving his old life he heads to Hollywood and uses his knowledge of the future to become a successful screenwriter by anticipating hit films from his original timeline. Along the way he encounters other reincarnates who have used their time loops to change their lives and history including Einstein, Heinlein and Casanova.
2018	The Seven Deaths of Evelyn Hardcastle	Stuart Turton	Evelyn Hardcastle will be murdered at 11:00 p.m. There are eight days, and eight witnesses. We will only let you escape once you tell us the name of the killer.
2018	The Psychology of Time Travel	Kate Mascarenhas	After its invention by four women in 1967, time travel is governed by an organization called the Conclave. The granddaughter of one of those women is knowledgeable about the complex effects such trips have on the mind, and her life intertwines with numerous time travelers and a mysterious murder.
2021	Great Power Heavy Industry	Qi Cheng	The story depicts a contemporary man who travels back in time to 1980 to help China better develop its industries. It received several awards, including making the list of Themed Online Literary Works recognized by the National Press and Publication Administration and the China Writers Association for the celebration of the Seventieth Anniversary of the People's Republic of China.
2024	The Ministry of Time	Kaliane Bradley	A government employee in the newly founded Ministry of Time takes care of time-traveller, Arctic explorer Graham Gore, who has been brought to the present day.

== Time Travel Short Story Collections ==
Year	Title	Editors(s)	Description
2013	The Time Traveler's Almanac	Ann and Jeff VanderMeer.	A collection of 65 stories about time travel include Ray Bradbury's A Sound of Thunder and C. L. Moore's Vintage Season.
2021	Voyager: Twelve Journeys Through Space and Time	Robert Silverberg	Retrospective collection of the author's own works including Sailing to Byzantium

== Film ==
Time travel is a common theme and plot device in science fiction films. The list below covers films for which time travel is central to the plot or premise of the work.

Year	Title	Director(s)	Description
1921	A Connecticut Yankee in King Arthur's Court	Emmett J. Flynn	The first adaptation of Mark Twain's classic; modern-day Martin Cavendish dreams that he is transported back to King Arthur's court, where he has to use modern knowledge to outwit the king's enemies.
1930	Just Imagine	David Butler	A man struck by lightning in 1930, wakes up to a 1980 with personal aircraft, vending machines replacing sexual activity, spacecraft to Mars, people with letter and digit-based names, pill meals, and government-determined marriages.
1931	A Connecticut Yankee	David Butler	The first sound version of Mark Twain's story, in which a radio salesman (Will Rogers) is knocked out and wakes up in the land of King Arthur.
1933	Turn Back the Clock	Edgar Selwyn	Only a single time loop is needed for Joe to wish that he could relive his life and marry the wealthy woman. When he has the chance to go through his life again, he has interesting discoveries and decisions.
1933	Berkeley Square	Frank Lloyd	A modern man is transported back to 18th-century London, where he meets his ancestors and falls in love with a woman of the era.
1933	Roman Scandals	Frank Tuttle	A delivery man imagines himself in Ancient Rome.
1937	Ali Baba Goes to Town	David Butler	A hobo falls asleep on a film set and wakes up in 10th-century Baghdad.
1944	Time Flies	Walter Forde	A man goes back in time to the 16th century and meets William Shakespeare.
1944	Fiddlers Three	Harry Watt	Two sailors go back in time to Ancient Rome and are mistaken as prophets.
1945	Where Do We Go from Here?	Gregory Ratoff	A genie transports a man throughout time.
1946	It's a Wonderful Life	Frank Capra	Small-town businessman George Bailey (James Stewart), a champion of affordable housing, is ruined by his rival, the town's banker. Feeling a failure, George wishes he had never been born. A guardian angel grants his wish; the town is now a joyless slum named for the banker, George's brother Harry, whom he saved as a child, is dead, as are hundreds of men Harry saved in World War II. George's wife never married, and their children were never born.
1947	Repeat Performance	Alfred L. Werker	Film noir meets science fiction when a woman shoots her husband on New Year's Eve, 1946, then wishes that she could live the year all over again.
1949	A Connecticut Yankee in King Arthur's Court	Tay Garnett	Very loosely based on Mark Twain's story, in which a mechanic (Bing Crosby) is knocked out and wakes up in the land of King Arthur.
1951	I'll Never Forget You	Roy Ward Baker	An American atomic scientist is transported to the 18th century, where he falls in love.
1955	Journey to the Beginning of Time	Karel Zeman	Four boys travel on the river of time and visit various prehistoric eras on their journey.
1956	World Without End	Edward Bernds	Astronauts returning from a voyage to Mars are caught in a time warp and transported into a post-Apocalyptic Earth populated by mutants.
1957	The Undead	Roger Corman	A woman is sent back in time, via hypnosis, to the Middle Ages, where she may be executed by the people of that time on suspicion of being a witch.
1960	Beyond the Time Barrier	Edgar G. Ulmer	A pilot flies faster than the speed of light, from 1960 to 2024, into a dystopian future divided by two populations: the submissive humans who have retreated underground and the savage mutants who have taken over the surface.
1960	The Time Machine	George Pal	Loose adaptation of H. G. Wells's classic in which a time traveler enters a future where the world is broken up into two classes: the peaceful Eloi and the malevolent masters of the world, the Morlocks.
1962	La Jetée	Chris Marker	A survivor of the Third World War is sent back in time to rescue the present. La Jetée inspired the 1995 film 12 Monkeys.
1964	The Time Travelers	Ib Melchior	Scientists find that their time-viewing screen allows them to travel through time and they become stranded in a post-apocalypse future. This film inspired the 1966 TV series, The Time Tunnel, as well as the 1967 remake, Journey to the Center of Time.
1965	Dr. Who and the Daleks	Gordon Flemyng	Based on the BBC TV series. The Doctor and his companions travel in the TARDIS to the future of a post-apocalyptic world where two races, the Daleks and the Thals, follow two different paths to survive following a nuclear war.
1966	Daleks – Invasion Earth: 2150 A.D.	Gordon Flemyng	Based on the BBC TV series. The Doctor and his companions travel in the TARDIS to a future London devastated by war with the Daleks.
1967	Journey to the Center of Time	David L. Hewitt	Scientists develop a time machine and travel to the far future where the earth is in peril and the distant past, to the age of the dinosaurs. A remake of The Time Travelers.
1968	Planet of the Apes	Franklin J. Schaffner	George Taylor (played by Charlton Heston) is an astronaut who travels to Earth in the distant future, due to the effects of time dilation, and finds that it is inhabited by intelligent, talking apes.
1970	Beneath the Planet of the Apes	Ted Post	Brent, an astronaut, travels to a future Earth ruled by apes. His search for fellow astronaut George Taylor leads him to an underground city of nuclear mutants.
1971	Escape from the Planet of the Apes	Don Taylor	Three apes escape Earth's destruction by salvaging and repairing the spaceship of astronaut George Taylor and piloting it through a time warp back to 1973.
1972	Slaughterhouse-Five	George Roy Hill	A man becomes displaced from time and experiences the events in his life in random order, including time spent in an alien civilization.
1973	Idaho Transfer	Peter Fonda	Due to an impending disaster that threatens to destroy mankind, a time machine is built by a group of young scientists to transport themselves into the future to rebuild civilization.
1973	Ivan Vasilievich: Back to the Future	Leonid Gaidai	Engineer Shurik has invented a time machine in his apartment. By accident, he sends two people back into the time of Ivan IV, while the real Ivan IV is sent by the same machine into Shurik's apartment.
1978	Superman	Richard Donner	Superman circles the Earth at tremendous speeds allowing him to travel back in time to just before an earthquake created by Lex Luthor.
1978	The Time Machine	Henning Schellerup	A made-for-television adaptation of the Wells novel, updating the initial setting to the contemporary 1970s, with the main character working for an American defense contractor. After various trips in time, he meets the Eloi and Morlocks of the far future.
1979	Time After Time	Nicholas Meyer	Using a time machine, Jack the Ripper and H. G. Wells travel from 1893 London to 1979 San Francisco.
1980	The Final Countdown	Don Taylor	A storm at sea transports a nuclear-powered aircraft carrier through a time portal back in time from the 1980s to 1941.
1980	Somewhere in Time	Jeannot Szwarc	A man is captivated by an old picture of a beautiful actress who he feels is connected to him somehow. Through self-hypnosis, he returns to the past and the love of his life. Adapted from the novel, Bid Time Return, by Richard Matheson who also wrote the script.
1980	The Day Time Ended	John Cardos	A triple supernova opens a rift in time space, propelling a family far into the future where they are attacked by monstrous aliens before finding refuge in a domed city.
1981	Time Bandits	Terry Gilliam	A young boy unwittingly joins a band of dwarves as they travel through time, hunting treasure.
1981	Baldios (The Movie)	Akiyoshi Sakai	Anime film featuring a Super Robot, based on the 1980 series. Aliens from the ravaged planet S-1 fight against 2100s earthlings, in order to conquer Earth. In the end, it is revealed that the war is based on a predestination paradox, where Earth eventually becomes S-1, and the aliens discover to be earthlings coming from the far future, with no knowledge of the real past of their planet.
1982	Timerider: The Adventure of Lyle Swann	William Dear	A motorcyclist competing in a desert race unknowingly gets caught in the middle of a time travel experiment and is transported by means of "time cannons" to the Old West of 1875–1877.
1983	Toki o Kakeru Shōjo	Nobuhiko Obayashi	A high-school girl accidentally acquires the ability to travel through time, which leads to her reliving multiple time loops. Based on Yasutaka Tsutsui's 1965 novel The Girl Who Leapt Through Time.
1983	Twilight Zone: The Movie	John Landis, Steven Spielberg, Joe Dante and George Miller	Big-screen adaptations of three classic episodes from the popular 1950s and 1960s Rod Serling television series, as well as a new segment featuring a bigot who is transported into the lives of past victims of racism.
1984	The Ice Pirates	Stewart Raffill	In the finale, characters go through time fields, which causes their ages to change and a couple to meet their future child as a result of a stranger version of time dilation.
1984	The Terminator	James Cameron	A cyborg (Arnold Schwarzenegger) known as the Terminator is sent back in time from 2029 to 1984 to destroy humanity by killing Sarah Connor, the mother of its future savior, John Connor.
1984	The Philadelphia Experiment	Stewart Raffill	In 1943, an anti-radar experiment accidentally sends two sailors forward in time to 1984. Nancy Allen and Michael Paré star in this film.
1984	Non ci resta che piangere	Roberto Benigni and Massimo Troisi	The school janitor, Mario (Troisi), and a teacher, Saverio (Benigni), have an automobile breakdown and decide to spend the night in an inn. The next morning, they awake in 15th-century Florence.
1985	Back to the Future	Robert Zemeckis	Using a time machine installed in a DeLorean sports car and invented by Emmett Brown, teenager Marty McFly intervenes in his parents' first meeting back in 1955, preventing them from falling in love and placing his own existence in danger.
1985	Trancers	Charles Band	The mind of Jack Deth, a cop in the dystopian Angel City of 2247, is sent backwards in time into one of his ancestor's bodies in 1985 Los Angeles to hunt a criminal who has done the same.
1985	Cavegirl	David Oliver	On a class excursion to a cave with Stone Age paintings, Rex, a clumsy teenager, gets lost. A mysterious crystal opens a gateway in time and sends him back to the Stone Ages, where he meets the beautiful girl, Eba.
1985	My Science Project	Jonathan R. Betuel	Michael and Ellie break into a military junkyard to find a science project. They find an orb that dangerously bends time and have to stop it to save the world.
1985	The Blue Yonder	Mark Rossman	An 11-year-old goes back in time to prevent his grandfather from making a fatal plane flight across the Atlantic. Aired on The Disney Sunday Movie under the name Time Flyer.
1986	Peggy Sue Got Married	Francis Ford Coppola	Peggy Sue Bodell faints at her high school reunion. When she wakes up, she finds herself in her own past, just before she finished high school.
1986	Biggles: Adventures in Time	John Hough	Catering salesman falls through a time hole to 1917, where he saves the life of a dashing Royal Flying Corps pilot, after his photo recon mission is shot down. Before he can work out what happened, he is returned to the 1980s.
1986	Star Trek IV: The Voyage Home	Leonard Nimoy	To save Earth, Admiral James T. Kirk and his crew travel back to 1986 to retrieve and take back humpback whales, the only beings who can communicate with an alien probe that is threatening Earth.
1986	Flight of the Navigator	Randal Kleiser	In 1978, a boy winds up 8 years in the future and discovers that an alien spaceship transported him there after he experienced extreme time dilation.
1987	Blind Chance / Przypadek	Krzysztof Kieślowski	This Polish film presents three different storylines, told in succession, about a man running after a train; slight variations lead to huge differences in the man's life. The film was an inspiration for Run Lola Run.
1987	Mirror for a Hero / Zerkalo dlya geroya	Vladimir Khotinenko	Two men travel from the 1980s to 1940s USSR, and find themselves repeatedly reliving a day in a coal mine town. The older man hopes he can atone for his past, while the younger begins to understand his father's earlier life.
1987	Timestalkers	Michael Schultz	A professor discovers evidence of a time traveller in Old West memorabilia, and becomes involved in trying to prevent the assassination of Grover Cleveland by a 26th-century villain.
1988	The Navigator: A Medieval Odyssey	Vincent Ward	Medieval travellers from 14th-century England tunnel through Earth and burst into 20th-century New Zealand.
1988	Out of Time	Robert Butler	A cop from the year 2088 (Abbott) is transported back to 1988 while pursuing a criminal attempting to flee in a time machine, and enlists the aid of his legendary great-grandfather (Maher) in pursuing the crook.
1989	Field of Dreams	Phil Alden Robinson	A man builds a baseball field on his farm to call back Chicago players banned due to the Black Sox Scandal. He gets his own chance to resolve his guilt over his deceased father.
1989	Time Trackers	Howard R. Cohen	Three time travelers from the future and a cop from the past must travel to Medieval England to capture a rogue scientist who wants to use time travel for his own needs.
1989	Back to the Future Part II	Robert Zemeckis	Marty McFly and Doc Brown travel to 2015 to prevent Marty's children from ruining the family reputation and repair the timeline after Biff Tannen plots to give a sports almanac to his younger self in 1955, allowing him to win millions of dollars gambling.
1989	Bill & Ted's Excellent Adventure	Stephen Herek	Two teenagers (Alex Winter and Keanu Reeves) need an "A" in history. A time traveller (George Carlin) helps them because they are destined to create a Utopian future. They travel through time, encountering historical figures including Socrates, Joan of Arc, and Billy the Kid.
1989	The Iceman Cometh	Clarence Fok	A royal guard from the Ming Dynasty and a rapist-killer are frozen and thaw out in modern-day Hong Kong.
1989	Millennium	Michael Anderson	Time travelers from the far future steal people already destined to die, such as in plane crashes, to restock humankind in their own desolate future. Based on the 1983 John Varley novel.
1989	Warlock	Steve Miner	A warlock in the 17th century who has been sentenced to death for witchcraft is transported to the 20th century, followed by a witch hunter who must stop the warlock from finding the Grand Grimoire.
1990	Frankenstein Unbound	Roger Corman	A scientist creates superweapon that also causes shifts in time. He is transported to 1817, where he meets Doctor Frankenstein and his monster, as well as Mary Shelley, who bases her novel on true events.
1990	Back to the Future Part III	Robert Zemeckis	Marty McFly travels back to 1885 to stop an outlaw from killing Doc Brown in a duel, and bring him back home to 1985.
1990	12:01 PM	Jonathan Heap	Myron Castleman (Kurtwood Smith) is an everyman-type who keeps repeating the same hour of his life, from 12:01pm to 1:00pm. The character is fully aware that the time loop is occurring, and nobody else appears to be aware of it. Each time the hour resets, Myron retains his memory, or as the film puts it, his consciousness, and despite his best attempts to understand what is happening, he ultimately realizes that he is helpless to prevent the time bounce. Myron cannot break the loop by killing himself, as he reappears, alive, at the next iteration; he is trapped in the loop for eternity. An adaptation of the short story by Richard A. Lupoff.
1991	Aditya 369	Singeetam Srinivasa Rao	Aditya 369 is a time machine invented by absent-minded professor Ram Das. Krishna, a young post-graduate, Hema and a smuggler, Raja, want to procure the machine for their own reasons.
1991	Terminator 2: Judgment Day	James Cameron	Having failed to prevent his existence, Skynet sends a shape-shifting terminator back to 1995 to kill 10-year-old John Connor, while future Connor sends a T-800 (Schwarzenegger) back to protect his past self and prevent a nuclear holocaust.
1991	Bill & Ted's Bogus Journey	Peter Hewitt	Two evil robot versions of Bill and Ted are sent back in time to kill them.
1991	Godzilla vs. King Ghidorah	Kazuki Ōmori	Terrorists from the year 2204 seek to destroy Japan and prevent it from becoming an economic superpower. They travel to 1944 and replace Godzilla with three genetically engineered creatures, which become the monster, King Ghidorah.
1992	Army of Darkness	Sam Raimi	Ash (Bruce Campbell), a supermarket employee, is sent back in time by a specific book to the 14th century to fight an undead army.
1992	Freejack	Geoff Murphy	In a future where time travel has been invented, the rich snatch people from history a moment before their death in order to use the bodies as hosts for their own minds after death.
1992	Timescape	David Twohy	A father and daughter meet travelers from the future, who intend to witness an impending catastrophe. The film is based on the novel, Vintage Season, by Henry Kuttner and C.L. Moore, and was released on video as Grand Tour: Disaster in Time.
1993	Teenage Mutant Ninja Turtles III	Stuart Gillard	The turtles go back in time to feudal Japan to rescue their kidnapped friend, April.
1993	Les Visiteurs	Jean-Marie Poiré	A 12th-century knight and his servant are mistakenly transported to the 20th century and find themselves adrift in modern society.
1993	Philadelphia Experiment II	Stephen Cornwell	A disastrous experiment in 1993 sends a stealth aircraft through a time portal into 1943 Germany. A sailor is pulled into the portal at the same time, and finds himself in a version of 1993 where the Nazis won World War II.
1993	12:01	Jack Sholder	Barry Thomas is an average office worker who witnesses the murder of a woman that he is attracted to. That night, during a storm, Barry gets a shock from a lamp's faulty power wire at exactly 12:01 a.m. In the next few days, he realizes that the world is trapped in a time loop, with himself the only one aware of it. Barry must prevent the murder and stop the time loop, or be caught in time forever.
1993	Groundhog Day	Harold Ramis	Weatherman Phil Connors (Bill Murray) is trapped re-living 2 February in Punxsutawney, Pennsylvania, leading him to re-examine his life and priorities.
1993	Future Cops	Wong Jing	To prevent a criminal from being arrested in 2043, three villains travels back to 1993 to assassinate the judge before he takes office, forcing three Future Cops to chase them into the past to protect him.
1994	Time Chasers	David Giancola	An amateur inventor goes through time with an airplane to stop a villain from changing history for profit.
1994	A.P.E.X.	Phillip J. Roth	A time travel project probe from the year 2073 is sent to the year 1973 and goes wrong, creating a plague-ravaged, alternate timeline whose inhabitants are locked in a constant battle with killer robots. The hero must find a similar time machine in this alternate world and prevent the disaster from ever happening.
1994	Star Trek Generations	David Carson	USS Enterprise captains James T. Kirk and Jean-Luc Picard meet through the effects of an energy ribbon.
1994	Timecop	Peter Hyams	The Time Enforcement Commission (TEC) is created to prevent alterations to the past. This causes a dilemma for the hero, Max Walker, who has to prevent time-travellers from altering time, but is tempted to do so himself, to prevent his wife's death.
1995	A Kid in King Arthur's Court	Michael Gottlieb	Loosely based on Mark Twain's A Connecticut Yankee in King Arthur's Court, Calvin Fuller, a baseball-loving boy, falls into King Arthur's time. Dubbed a saviour, he dazzles Camelot with futuristic "magic," aids Arthur against a usurper, and wins the heart of Princess Katey. With Merlin's help, he returns home, hitting a home run and leaving a lasting impression on Arthur.
1995	Jumanji		After being trapped within the world of the Jumanji board game for 26 years after getting sucked into it in 1969, Alan Parrish is released by siblings Judy and Peter Shepard. Reuniting with his childhood friend Sarah Whittle, the four work together to finish the game. Alan and Sarah are transported back to 1969 and back into their child bodies.
1995	12 Monkeys	Terry Gilliam	James Cole is sent back in time to acquire an unmutated form of a virus that has nearly wiped out humanity.
1996	Christmas Every Day	Larry Peerce	An American television film based on William Dean Howells's 1892 short story, "Christmas Every Day". A selfish teenager is forced to relive the same Christmas every day until he comes to understand the true meaning of the holiday season.
1996	Doctor Who	Geoffrey Sax	The Doctor, in his eighth incarnation, has a showdown with the Master at the turn of the millennium, 31 December 1999.
1996	Star Trek: First Contact	Jonathan Frakes	The USS Enterprise follows the Borg back in time to stop them from altering history and preventing Earth's first warp flight and first contact with the Vulcans.
1997	Retroactive	Louis Morneau	An FBI agent repeatedly travels back in time to prevent a crime. The situation worsens each time, until she decides to let things play out.
1997	Time Under Fire	Jeff Fahey	A US submarine runs into a time rift and a special unit goes on a mission to see what's on the other side. They find themselves in an alternate dystopian America, now a one-man dictatorship, and decide to help the rebels.
1998	Run Lola Run / Lola Rennt	Tom Tykwer	Lola has to acquire 100,000 Deutsche Mark to save her boyfriend from the mob. The film follows one attempt after another to raise the money, each failure resetting time and restarting her run through the streets of Berlin.
1998	Lost in Space	Stephen Hopkins	In 2058, a family undertakes a voyage to a nearby star system to begin large-scale emigration from a soon-to-be uninhabitable Earth, but are thrown off course by a saboteur from the future and must try to find their way home.
1998	Rebirth of Mothra III	Okihiro Yoneda	Mothra travels back to the Cretaceous period to defeat the evil space monster, King Ghidorah, while he is younger and weaker.
1999	Time at the Top	Timothy Busfield, Elisha Cuthbert, Gabrielle Boni, Matthew Harbour	14-year-old Susan Shawson travels in time in her building's elevator, as altered by a retired physicist living in her building. It transports her from 1998 back to the same place in other years, depending on the order of buttons pushed. In 1881, she meets Victoria Walker, a girl her own age in need of assistance with her own family problems. Together, Susan, Victoria, and her young brother, Robert, succeed in changing both the past and the future.
1999	Austin Powers: The Spy Who Shagged Me	Jay Roach	Dr. Evil returns, having invented a time machine that allows him to go back to 1969, so he can steal Austin Powers' mojo.
1999	Galaxy Quest	Dean Parisot	A jump back in time of 13 seconds is all the time lead actor Jason Nesmith (Tim Allen) needs to save his crew from being killed.
1999	The Time Shifters	Mario Philip Azzopardi	A reporter notices that the same faces keep appearing in photographs of 20th-century disasters. Deducing that they are time travellers, he tries to save the history he knows.
1999	Teen Knight	Phil Comeau	Peter (Kris Lemche) wins a trip to a medieval park. As Peter and his friends tour the castle, Lord Drakin casts a spell and sends the Peter and his friends back to 1383 where they have to stop Lord Drakin from taking the castle. Released on DVD as Medieval Park.
1999	Back to the '50s	Andrew Margetson	The English pop group S Club 7 is transported to a desert town in the year 1959 that is under the control of a gang with a corrupted sheriff as an ally. The group learns about the fate of a local chef at a diner and tries to prevent bad things despite threats against them from both the sheriff and the gang.
1999	The Devil's Arithmetic	Donna Deitch	A TV movie about a young woman who, during her family's Passover Seder, finds herself transported back to Poland in 1942 and sent to a death camp.
2000	Frequency	Gregory Hoblit	An accidental cross-time radio link connects father and son across 30 years. The son tries to save his father's life, but then must fix the consequences.
2000	Happy Accidents	Brad Anderson	A New York woman with a string of failed relationships meets a time traveler from the year 2470.
2000	Ditto	Kim Jung-kwon	Two people separated in time are somehow able to talk to each other using an amateur radio. The people in question are two students in the same school, one in 1979, the other in 2000.
2000	The Kid	Jon Turteltaub	A 40-year-old image consultant (Bruce Willis) finds himself being visited by his 10-year-old self.
2000	For All Time	Steven Schachter	A middle-aged man stumbles across an antique watch that transports him to 1896. He falls in love, and decides to stay. He breaks the watch, then sees the situation in a new light as complications occur.
2000	Il Mare	Lee Hyun-seung	Two protagonists live in a lake house two years apart in time, but are able to communicate through a mysterious post box. This movie inspired the 2006 American film, The Lake House.
2001	Black Knight	Gil Junger	After falling into a theme park's fetid moat, a custodian (Martin Lawrence) crawls out into fourteenth-century England.
2001	Donnie Darko	Richard Kelly	A teenager unknowingly re-lives October 1988 and is forced by a man in a demonic bunny suit to commit crimes in order to re-set the timeline.
2001	Just Visiting	Jean-Marie Poiré	A medieval knight and his serf travel to 21st-century Chicago, meeting the knight's descendant. But they must travel back to their time to ensure her birth. Remake of the 1993 French movie Les Visiteurs.
2001	Kate & Leopold	James Mangold	A duke time travels from 1876 to the present and falls in love with a career woman in New York.
2001	Pokémon 4Ever	Kunihiko Yuyama Jim Malone	The film focuses on Celebi, who travels to the future with Sammy, a young Professor Oak, while being chased by the Iron Masked Marauder.
2001	Halloweentown II: Kalabar's Revenge	Kimberly J. Brown	TV film: In this Disney Channel movie, Marnie Piper travels through time in Halloweentown to find a spell book that will help her counteract the evil spell placed on Halloweentown. To return to present time, both Marnie and Luke travel through a time tunnel on a broomstick.
2002	2009: Lost Memories (2009 loseuteu maemorijeu)	Si-myung Lee	
2002	Returner	Takashi Yamazaki	The human race is on the edge of annihilation after decades of war with an alien force. In an outpost in Tibet, mankind's last hope of survival is a time travel device.
2002	The Time Machine	Simon Wells	In this remake of the 1960s version of the film, directed by H. G. Wells' great-grandson, Dr. Alexander Hartdegen travels to the future hoping to find a time where they have learned how to change the past. In the year 802,701, he becomes involved in a struggle between surface-dwelling Eloi and the underground-dwelling Morlocks.
2002	Time Changer	Rich Christiano	A Bible professor from 1890 is sent forward in time to the present via a time machine, and is astonished to see how commonplace sin has become due to the separation of religion from morality.
2002	Timequest	Robert Dyke	A time traveler prevents Kennedy's assassination and history takes an alternate course.
2002	Austin Powers in Goldmember	Jay Roach	Upon learning that his father has been kidnapped, Austin Powers must travel to 1975 and defeat the villain Goldmember – who is working with Dr. Evil.
2002	Cube 2: Hypercube	Andrzej Sekuła	A group of strangers mysteriously awakens in a giant cubic structure in which each room warps space-time in a different way.
2003	Bottom Live 2003: Weapons Grade Y-Fronts Tour	Rick Mayall	Eddie Hitler builds a time traveling toilet which he calls the TURDIS.
2003	Fun2shh... Dudes in the 10th Century	Imtiaz Punjabi	About a group of friends who end-up travelling back to 10th-century India.
2003	Timeline	Richard Donner	In this film adaptation of the book by Michael Crichton, archaeologists travel to medieval France to rescue their professor, and find themselves in the middle of a battle.
2003	Terminator 3: Rise of the Machines	Jonathan Mostow	In 2032, Skynet sends another Terminator back in time, this time to 2004, in a final attempt to kill John Connor before the inevitable nuclear holocaust on mankind.
2004	Harry Potter and the Prisoner of Azkaban	Alfonso Cuarón	Hermione Granger receives a Time-Turner from Professor McGonagall, so she can attend more classes than time would normally allow. She and Harry later use the Time-Turner to save Sirius Black and Buckbeak.
2004	Channel Chasers	Butch Hartman	Punished with a week without any more television, Timmy Turner wishes himself into the world of television to escape the harsh reality of his life. However, his carelessness with magic leads to his tyrannical babysitter, Vicky, taking over the future, and now he must stop her.
2004	Primer	Shane Carruth	Two friends build a time machine that allows them to create multiple, co-existing timelines. The effects and consequences of these interacting timelines, change the personalities of the characters and ruin their friendship.
2004	The Butterfly Effect	Eric Bress & J. Mackye Gruber	A college psychology student (Ashton Kutcher) learns that, by reading his childhood journals, he can temporarily travel to the past and inhabit his younger body. By changing his past behaviours, he changes his current life, with unforeseen consequences.
2004	Traumschiff Surprise – Periode 1	Michael Herbig	German comedy film in which Queen Metapha (Anja Kling), space taxi driver Rock (Til Schweiger) and the crew of the spaceship Surprise must travel 300 years back in time to prevent the Martian invasion of Earth.
2004	13 Going on 30	Gary Winick	In 1987, a 13-year-old girl makes a birthday wish and wakes up as a 30-year-old woman.
2005	Fetching Cody	David Ray	Distraught over his girlfriend's drug addiction, small-time dope peddler Art (Jay Baruchel), uses a time machine to journey into the past in a desperate gamble to change her future.
2005	The Jacket	John Maybury	An amnesiac, Persian Gulf War veteran (Adrien Brody) is subjected to an experimental treatment which moves him forward 15 years.
2005	Slipstream	David van Eyssen	A socially inept scientist (Sean Astin) and a female FBI agent (Ivana Miličević) try to recover a time travel device (called "Slipstream") that was stolen by a group of bank robbers.
2005	A Sound of Thunder	Peter Hyams	For an extraordinary price, Time Safaris, Inc. will take clients through a wormhole to hunt dinosaur game. The plot is based loosely on the 1952 short story by Ray Bradbury, with the butterfly effect portrayed as much more pronounced.
2005	Summer Time Machine Blues	Katsuyuki Motohiro	Five college boys in a science fiction club break their air-conditioner's remote control. In the sweltering clubhouse, a time machine appears and they go back in time to retrieve a functioning controller, but this causes complications.
2005	Camp Slaughter	Alex Pucci	A slasher film in which a group of present-day teenagers are sent back to 1981, and discover a summer camp which is stuck reliving the day a demented killer went on a rampage.
2006	The Lake House	Alejandro Agresti	A time-travel romance where two people living in the same house at a lake, at different times, are able to exchange letters through its mailbox and fall in love.
2006	Click	Frank Coraci	Michael Newman (Adam Sandler) is given a remote that lets him fast forward, pause, and rewind his life.
2006	The Girl Who Leapt Through Time	Mamoru Hosoda	A teenage girl discovers that she can leap through time. Based on Yasutaka Tsutsui's 1965 novel of the same name.
2006	Idiocracy	Mike Judge	In 2005, an average private named Joe Bauers (Luke Wilson) is selected for a hibernation program and is placed in suspended animation for is supposed to be one year, but ends up accidentally being five hundred years, and finds that the human race of the future has devolved with lower intelligence, making him the smartest man alive.
2006	Déjà Vu	Tony Scott	Denzel Washington is an ATF agent investigating a terrorist act, who is invited to assist in a government time-travel surveillance project.
2006	Christmas Do-Over	Catherine Cyran	In a remake of Christmas Every Day, a father has to repeat Christmas Dayuntil he realizes how selfish he has become and changes his ways.
2006	Salvage		After finishing the graveyard shift at a convenience store, Claire is murdered in her home, only to wake up in the convenience store, and start the cycle over again. An official selection of the 2006 Sundance Festival.
2007	Cinderella III: A Twist in Time	Frank Nissen	Cinderella's stepmother turns back time using the Fairy Godmother's magic wand to change the past and have her daughter Anastasia marry the prince.
2007	Monica's Gang in an Adventure in Time		The characters from Monica and Friends travels across time in search of the Four Elements to save reality as we know it.
2007	Next	Lee Tamahori	Cris Johnson (Nicolas Cage), a Las Vegas magician able to see and live out scenarios 2 minutes before they actually happen, finds himself the target of an FBI agent trying to prevent a bombing.
2007	Bender's Big Score	Dwayne Carey-Hill	Alien scammers discover the code for time travel tattooed on Philip J. Fry's buttocks, and use it to send Bender back in time to steal priceless artifacts.
2007	Meet the Robinsons	Stephen Anderson	A young boy named Lewis is taken to the year 2037 by his future son, Wilbur, to stop the Bowler Hat Guy, who has stolen Lewis' memory-scanning machine.
2007	Premonition	Mennan Yapo	A housewife (Sandra Bullock) discovers that she is living the days around her husband's death in a non-chronological sequence, and attempts to prevent his death.
2007	Secret	Jay Chou	A high school music student discovers that she can travel forward in time with the help of a mysterious piano piece called "Secret".
2007	Timecrimes	Nacho Vigalondo	A man accidentally travels back to the past and meets himself there.
2007	The Last Day of Summer		11-year-old Luke gets his wish that every day could be the last day of summer.
2008	Love Story 2050	Harry Baweja	About time travel to a utopian Mumbai in 2050 India.
2008	Minutemen	Lev L. Spiro	Three high-school outcasts use a time machine to save their classmates from embarrassing moments. Their time travel creates a black hole, which could destroy the world. A Disney Channel Original Movie.
2008	Stargate: Continuum	Martin Wood	In a direct-to-video film in the Stargate franchise, Ba'al (Cliff Simon) changes the timeline so that SG-1 never existed. Three people were unaffected by the change, but are unable to do anything until Ba'al and the system lords arrive.
2009	Star Trek	J. J. Abrams	Spock's attempt to prevent a supernova fails, resulting in the destruction of the Romulan homeworld. The captain of a Romulan mining ship blames Spock, and both the Romulans and Spock fall through a black hole to the past, creating an alternate reality.
2009	Pokémon: Arceus and the Jewel of Life	Kunihiko Yuyama	Dialga sends Ash Ketchum, Brock, Dawn, and Sheena back in time to prevent Damos from betraying Arceus and stealing the Jewel of Life, which led to it attacking humanity.
2009	Mr. Nobody	Jaco Van Dormael	A romantic drama about Nemo Nobody (Jared Leto), a 118-year-old man and the last mortal on Earth, who remembers alternate versions of his life and three ages when his life was changed by a decision.
2009	The Time Traveler's Wife	Robert Schwentke	A romantic drama about a Chicago librarian (Eric Bana) with a gene that causes him to involuntarily time travel, and the complications it creates for his marriage. Based on the Audrey Niffenegger novel.
2009	Frequently Asked Questions About Time Travel	Gareth Carrivick	Three friends attempt to navigate a time-travel conundrum in the middle of a British pub. Anna Faris plays a girl from the future who sets the adventure in motion.
2009	A Christmas Carol	Robert Zemeckis	On Christmas Eve, miserly moneylender Ebenezer Scrooge (Jim Carrey) is visited by the Ghosts of Christmas Past, Present and Future, who convince him to change his ways.
2009	Land of the Lost	Brad Silberling	A disgraced paleontologist, his research assistant, and a macho tour guide find themselves in a strange, alternate world inhabited by dinosaurs, monkey people, and reptilian Sleestaks after they are sucked into a space-time vortex.
2009	Triangle	Christopher Smith	A woman who went on a yacht trip with her friends jumps to another ship after a mysterious weather condition, and gets caught in a terrifying time loop.
2010	Action Replayy	Vipul Amrutlal Shah	Indian film. A young man named Bunty uses a time machine created by his girlfriend's grandfather to meet his own parents before they were married, and help them develop a more loving relationship.
2010	The Disappearance of Haruhi Suzumiya	Tatsuya Ishihara	Kyon is the only one who knows that two of his classmates are missing and reality has changed. To restore his life, he gathers several keys to power an alien device and travel back three years.
2010	Hot Tub Time Machine	Steve Pink	Four friends spend a crazy, drunken night in a hot tub at a ski resort only to travel back in time to 1986, where they are each presented with an opportunity to alter their futures. The film stars John Cusack, Rob Corddry, Craig Robinson, and Clark Duke.
2010	Repeaters	Carl Bessai	A group of inmates at a rehabilitation facility are forced to repeatedly repeat the same day.
2010	Prince of Persia: The Sands of Time	Mike Newell	Disney's adaptation of the video game of the same name. Prince Dastan (Jake Gyllenhaal) has to prevent someone from changing history using a special dagger which, when fueled with a special "Sand of Time", allows its wielder to experience time differently.
2010	Time Traveller: The Girl Who Leapt Through Time	Mamoru Hosoda	A teenage girl discovers that she can leap through time. Based on Yasutaka Tsutsui's 1965 novel The Girl Who Leapt Through Time.
2010	Yu-Gi-Oh! 3D: Bonds Beyond Time	Kenichi Takeshita	Series protagonists Yusei Fudo, Jaden Yuki and Yugi Mutou encounter Turbo Duelist Paradox, who is from the future and believes the only way to prevent his future from happening is to stop Duel Monsters from existing.
2010	Shrek Forever After	Mike Mitchell	When Shrek begins missing his old life, he makes a deal with Rumpelstiltskin and is sent to an alternate timeline where he never existed and Rumpelstiltskin rules.
2011	Ticking Clock	Ernie Barbarash	James is a man from the year 2032 who travels back in time with a custom-made watch that is a time machine. He travels back in time to fix his life but fails.
2011	Source Code	Duncan Jones	Captain Colter Stevens (Jake Gyllenhaal) died in a helicopter crash and has been inserted in a computer program (Source Code) which transfers him to the body of a deceased person for the last eight minutes of his life. He cannot change the past, but he must use past information to alter the future and prevent a bombing.
2011	Midnight in Paris	Woody Allen	While visiting Paris with his fiancée, an American writer (Owen Wilson) discovers a way to travel back to the 1920s, allowing him to meet and draw inspiration from historical greats such as Ernest Hemingway, F. Scott Fitzgerald, and Gertrude Stein.
2011	12 Dates of Christmas	James Hayman	Kate finds herself repeatedly reliving Christmas Eve and a blind date with a man named Miles. She must discover how to break the cycle – should she attempt to win back her ex-boyfriend Jack, or should she pursue Miles, or something else?
2011	The Man from the Future	Cláudio Torres	When a brilliant physicist inadvertently creates a time machine, he goes back 20 years to the party where his girlfriend left him. Changing the events of that evening has effects that he does not anticipate.
2012	Adhisaya Ulagam	Shakthi Scott	Prehistoric adventure film about time travel to the era of dinosaurs. The first dinosaur film of India.
2012	Safety Not Guaranteed	Colin Trevorrow	A comedy film inspired by a 1997 classified ad in Backwoods Home Magazine from a person asking for someone to accompany him in time travel.
2012	Men in Black 3	Barry Sonnenfeld	Agent J travels back in time to MIB's early years in the 1960s in order to stop an alien from assassinating his friend, Agent K, and changing history.
2012	Looper	Rian Johnson	Criminal organizations hire contract killers, called Loopers, to kill humans sent to them through time travel.
2012	After	Ryan Whitaker Smith	Two survivors of a bus crash experience a bizarre shared reality, which is gradually understood as they relive childhood events that had led to tragedy, but now result in finding courage and love.
2012	Dimensions	Sloane U’Ren	Time travel, love and betrayal in 1920s England. A brilliant scientist becomes obsessed with revisiting his past – no matter what the cost. Jealousy, desire and greed surround him, clouding his judgement and sending him spiralling towards madness.
2012	Thermae Romae	Hideki Takeuchi	Roman architect, Lucius, repeatedly travels to present-day Japan, where he is inspired by modern baths and toilets.
2012	Mine Games	Richard Gray (director)	A group of friends vacationing in the woods discover their own corpses and realize they are trapped in a time loop.
2013	+1	Dennis Iliadis	Three college friends hit the biggest party of the year, where a mysterious phenomenon disrupts the night, quickly descending into a chaos that challenges their friendships.
2013	Hyperfutura	James O'Brien	In a dystopian future, citizens without jobs are sent to work camps and never heard from again. Adam Leben is a laid-off factory worker. To save his life, he answers an ad for a medical test experiment, plunging down a rabbit hole of genetic engineering, mind control, and time travel. Based on the epic poem by Eric Kopatz.
2013	Ruby Red (German: Rubinrot)	Felix Fuchssteiner	A 16-year-old girl discovers that she has inherited her family's time-travel gene. To time-travel safely, she has to cooperate with a secret order of time travelers who have a special task for her in the 17th century.
2013	Haunter	Vincenzo Natali	The ghost of a teenager, Lisa Johnson (Abigail Breslin) who, along with her family, keeps reliving the same day, with her being the only one aware of it. She tries to protect a young girl, Olivia (Eleanor Zichy) and her family from a dead serial killer, the Pale Man (Stephen McHattie), who can possess the living.
2013	I'll Follow You Down	Richie Mehta	A present-day professor disappears, traveling back in time to visit Albert Einstein. Twelve years later, his college-age son follows him to find out why.
2013	Shree	Rajesh Bachchani	As part of an experiment, a man unknowingly travels into the future only to find out that he is going to be framed in a series of killings.
2013	The A.R.K. Report	Shmuel Hoffman	In this short film, a young girl travels into the future to find the ancient Ark of the Covenant and prevent it from falling into the hands of an evil army.
2013	Coherence	James Ward Byrkit	On the night of an astronomical anomaly, eight friends at a dinner party experience a troubling chain of reality bending events.
2013	About Time	Richard Curtis	Tim's father tells his son that the men in their family have always had the ability to travel through time. Tim makes numerous trips to the past to change his circumstances and those of his friends.
2013	Rewind	Jack Bender	A team of scientists and military personnel travel back in time to the 1920s to change the past and prevent a major terrorist attack on present day New York.
2013	11 A.M.	Kim Hyun-seok	A group of time-travel researchers at a deep-sea facility make their first test run 24 hours into the future, only to discover the facility close to destruction. They escape back to the present, but have less than 24 hours to avert the coming tragedy.
2013	Saving Santa	Leon Joosen Aaron Seelman	A lowly stable elf finds that he is the only one who can stop an invasion of the North Pole by using the secret of Santa's Sleigh, a TimeGlobe, to travel back in time to save Santa, twice.
2014	Mr. Peabody & Sherman	Rob Minkoff	The time-travelling adventures of an anthropomorphic canine and his adopted human son, as they endeavor to fix a time rift that they created.
2014	X-Men: Days of Future Past	Bryan Singer	The X-Men send Wolverine's consciousness to 1973 to prevent a war between the Sentinels and mutants.
2014	Edge of Tomorrow	Doug Liman	An officer (Tom Cruise) finds himself caught in a time loop in a war with an alien race. Based on 2004 novel All You Need Is Kill by Hiroshi Sakurazaka.
2014	Predestination	Michael and Peter Spierig	A temporal agent goes back in time to catch an infamous terrorist known as the "Fizzle Bomber", and meets different versions of himself. Based on the short story, "All You Zombies", by Robert A. Heinlein.
2014	Time Lapse	Bradley D. King	A group of friends discover a machine that can take pictures of things 24 hours into the future and the troubles that this machine causes.
2014	Interstellar	Christopher Nolan	Set in the near future, a crew of astronauts travels through a wormhole to find a suitable new planet for humanity, experiencing time dilation on multiple occasions.
2014	Premature	Dan Beers	On one of the most important days of his life, Rob, a high school senior, finds himself in a time loop that is triggered every time he ejaculates.
2014	The Infinite Man	Hugh Sullivan	A man's attempts to construct the ultimate romantic weekend backfires when his quest for perfection traps his lover in an infinite loop.
2014	Movement and Location	Alexis Boling	An immigrant from 400 years in the future is sent back in time to live an easier life.
2015	Project Almanac	Dean Israelite	A group of teenagers construct a time machine, based on blueprints that the main character's father was developing for the United States military.
2015	Hot Tub Time Machine 2	Steve Pink	The sequel to Hot Tub Time Machine.
2015	Synchronicity	Jacob Gentry	A physicist who invents a time machine must travel back to the past to uncover the truth about his creation and the woman who is trying to steal it.
2015	Indru Netru Naalai	R. Ravikumar	A scientist in 2065 invents a time machine and, to prove its capability, sends it back to 2015. However, the machine is discovered by three people who use the machine for reasons of their own. The first Indian Tamil-language science fiction film.
2015	Terminator Genisys	Alan Taylor	In 2029, Kyle Reese goes back in time to protect Sarah Connor, as previously established in The Terminator. When Reese arrives in 1984, he finds a new chronology, where Sarah was trained in combat from childhood, and must figure out how to prevent Judgment Day.
2015	Kung Fury	David Sandberg	Short film. A martial artist cop travels from the 1980s to the 1940s to battle Adolf Hitler, taking a detour to Viking times in the process.
2016	Paradox	Michael Hurst	When a scientist on a team working on a time travel project successfully travels one hour into the future, he returns with shocking news.
2016	Batman v Superman: Dawn of Justice	Zack Snyder	The Flash travels back in time to warn Bruce Wayne of future apocalyptic events.
2016	Alice Through the Looking Glass	James Bobin	Alice uses the Chronosphere to travel back in time, where she encounters the younger versions of the Mad Hatter and the Queen of Hearts.
2016	24	Vikram Kumar	Indian film about a scientist named Sethuraman who invents a time machine in the form of a watch but his evil twin brother, Athreya, will go to any lengths to get the device for himself.
2016	Aatadukundam Raa	G. Nageswara Reddy	Indian action-romance film involving time travel to ancient India.
2016	Baar Baar Dekho	Nitya Mehra	Indian romantic-drama about a man who tries to fix his relationship by skipping forwards and backwards through time.
2016	Doctor Strange	Scott Derrickson	Doctor Strange enters the Dark Dimension and uses the Eye of Agamotto to create a time loop around himself and Dormammu. After repeatedly killing Strange to no avail, Dormammu finally gives in to Strange's demand that he leave Earth.
2016	Your Name	Makoto Shinkai	Two high school students, Taki and Mitsuha, begin to swap bodies and form a relationship despite living three years apart in time.
2017	Before I Fall	Ry Russo-Young	A popular high school senior finds herself repeatedly reliving the same day.
2017	Bullyparade: The Movie	Michael Herbig	German comedy anthology film. In one episode, two Saxon brothers travel back into the year 1989 to prevent the fall of the Berlin Wall and the concert of David Hasselhoff which happened at this event.
2017	Happy Death Day	Christopher B. Landon	A snobby young woman is murdered at her birthday party and wakes up the morning of her death alive, repeatedly facing the same day.
2017	Naked	Michael Tiddes	A naked man is caught in a time loop on the day of his wedding.
2017	Time Trap	Mark Dennis and Ben Foster	A group of students in a remote area of Texas, searching for their missing professor, discover a mysterious cave by accident. While exploring the cave, the group experience a series of bizarre and dangerous events related to spacetime distortion caused by time dilation.
2017	The Endless	Justin Benson, Aaron Moorhead	Two brothers return to the 'UFO death cult' camp where they were raised and encounter people caught in time loops.
2017	Jumanji: Welcome to the Jungle	Jake Kasdan	In 1996, teenager Alex becomes trapped in the video game Jumanji; he perceives that a few months, only to discover from people newly sucked into the game that 21 years have passed. After beating the game, he finds himself brought back to 1996 in his teenage body.
2018	When We First Met	Ari Sandel	A man in love uses a photobox to travel back in time to change his life.
2018	A Wrinkle in Time	Ava DuVernay	Thirteen-year-old middle school student Meg Murry struggles to adjust to both her school and home life ever since her father Alex, a well-renowned scientist, mysteriously disappeared.
2018	How Long Will I Love U	Su Lun	Disordered wormhole merges a Shanghai apartment at different times, forcing the homeowners, Lu Ming in 1999 and Gu Xiaojiao in 2018, becomes roommates. When the homeowner is in the apartment, he or she can only open the corresponding door.
2018	Tamizh Padam 2	C. S. Amudhan	Indian parody film involving time travel to ancient India in the 3rd-century BC.
2018	Time Freak	Andrew Bowler	When a physics student is dumped by his girlfriend, he invents a time machine and uses it to go back in time in order to fix every mistake he made during the relationship.
2018	The Last Sharknado: It's About Time	Anthony C. Ferrante	In order to save the world from the titular "sharknadoes", Fin Shepard, his wife April and their friends Nova, Bryan and Skye travel through time to destroy the storms in different historical eras.
2019	Happy Death Day 2U	Christopher B. Landon	Tree Gelbman discovers that dying over and over was surprisingly easier than the dangers that lie ahead.
2019	The Lego Movie 2: The Second Part	Mike Mitchell	Rex Dangervest, a version of Emmet Brickowski from the future, travels through time to save his past self from the Stairgate and make him tough so that he can crash Queen Watevra Wa'Nabi's wedding and start Armamageddon, taking revenge on his friends who abandoned him.
2019	Non ci resta che il crimine	Massimiliano Bruno	Three friends enter a wormhole and travel in time to 1982 in Rome, Italy.
2019	See You Yesterday	Stefon Bristol	An ambitious science prodigy creates time machines, in order to save her brother from a fatal incident. As she tries to alter the events of the past, she will eventually face the perilous consequences of time travel.
2019	Avengers: Endgame	Anthony and Joe Russo	The Avengers travel back in time to the events of The Avengers (2012), Thor: The Dark World (2013), and Guardians of the Galaxy (2014) in order to retrieve the Infinity Stones. A final battle ensues after Nebula's cybernetic implants interface with those of her 2014 counterpart and alerts 2014 Thanos to their plans to reverse the Blip from Avengers: Infinity War.
2019	Scary Stories to Tell in the Dark	André Øvredal	In the third act, the main character, Stella Nicholls, is temporarily taken back in time and experiences the main antagonist's, Sarah Bellow's moment in her life, where she was tormented by her family.
2019	In the Shadow of the Moon	Jim Mickle	A Philadelphia police officer struggles with a lifelong obsession to track down a mysterious serial killer whose crimes defy explanation.
2019	Hello World	Tomohiko Itō	A man travels in time from the year 2027 to relive his school years and correct a bad decision in his life.
2019	Terminator: Dark Fate	Tim Miller	A new Terminator (Gabriel Luna) is sent from the future to eliminate the new future leader of humanity, following John Connor's demise.
2020	Bill & Ted Face the Music	Dean Parisot	Bill and Ted go to the future to get the music they were destined to write and save reality before it collapses, while their daughters go to the past to retrieve musicians in order to help their fathers.
2020	Tenet	Christopher Nolan	The plot follows a secret agent (John David Washington) as he manipulates the flow of time to prevent World War III.
2020	Boss Level	Joe Carnahan	A retired special forces soldier tries to escape a never-ending time loop that results in his death.
2020	Palm Springs	Max Barbakow	Two strangers meet at a wedding in Palm Springs and get stuck in a time loop.
2021	Dikkiloona	Karthik Yogi	Indian film about a man who tries to change his past by travelling back in time.
2021	The Map of Tiny Perfect Things	Lev Grossman	Two teenagers create routines and perfect moments while stuck in a time loop together.
2021	Hi, Mom	Jia Ling	A young woman finds herself transported back in time from her mother's deathbed in 2001 to 1981, the year before her birth. She befriends her mother and tries to set her up for a better life.
2021	Zack Snyder's Justice League	Zack Snyder	Barry Allen (The Flash) enters the Speed Force and reverses time in order to prevent the Unity of the Mother Boxes.
2021	The Tomorrow War	Chris McKay	The world is stunned when a group of time travelers arrive from the year 2051 to deliver an urgent message: thirty years in the future, mankind is losing a global war against a deadly alien species.
2021	Maanaadu	Venkat Prabhu	Indian film. A man and a police officer get trapped in a time loop on the day of the chief minister's public conference. Despite attempting to escape, they must repeatedly live the same day.
2022	Alice	Krystin Ver Linden	Historical drama/revenge thriller set in Antebellum Georgia, in which escaping slave Alice (Keke Palmer) inexplicably finds her way to 1973.
2022	The Adam Project	Shawn Levy	Fighter pilot Adam Reed (Ryan Reynolds) crash-lands in 2022 from 2050, where he teams up with his twelve-year-old self in order to save their future.
2022	Magic Spot	Charles Roxburgh	Comedy film about cousins Walter (Matt Farley) and Poopy (Chris Peterson) who use a "Magic Spot", a rock that, when stood atop, allows them to travel back in time and observe the past.
2022	Bimbisara	Mallidi Vassishta	About the ancient Indian king Bimbisara who time travels to modern-day India.
2023	Indiana Jones and the Dial of Destiny	James Mangold	A fictionalized version of the Antikythera mechanism is used by Nazis in an attempt to rewrite World War II. However it instead takes them from 1969 to 212 BC, to the Siege of Syracuse.
2023	Mark Antony	Adhik Ravichandran	In 1995, a young mechanic named Mark finds a telephone which can contact the past, created by Chiranjeevi. He uses it to learn the truth about his father Antony, a gangster who died in 1975.
2023	57 Seconds	Rusty Cundieff	
2025	Nirvanna the Band the Show the Movie	Matt Johnson	When their plan to book a show at The Rivoli goes horribly wrong, Matt and Jay accidentally travel back to the year 2008.
2026	The End of Oak Street	David Robert Mitchell	A suburban family and their neighborhood is in 1982 transported back to the Mesozoic through wormholes, and must try avoid being killed by dinosaurs.

== Television ==
Time travel is a recurrent theme in science fiction television programs. The list below covers television series for which time travel is central to the premise and direction of the plot and setting.

Start date	End date	Title	Creator(s)	Description
1951	1956	Captain Z-Ro	Roy Steffens	Scientist Captain Z-Ro, working in his remote laboratory, safeguards mankind and history from harm. With his time machine, he both views history and sends someone back in time when the past has been altered.
1959	1960	The Rocky and Bullwinkle Show – "Peabody's Improbable History" segments		Mr. Peabody and Sherman travel to different places and events in history using the WABAC time machine.
1963 (classic) 2005 (revival)	1989 (classic) – (revival)	Doctor Who	Sydney Newman (classic), Russell T Davies, Steven Moffat, Chris Chibnall (revival)	A Time Lord called "the Doctor", an extraterrestrial being from the planet Gallifrey who appears human, explores the universe in a time-travelling space ship called the TARDIS. Accompanied by a number of companions, the Doctor combats a variety of foes while working to save civilisations and help people in need.
1966	1967	It's About Time	Sherwood Schwartz	Two astronauts accidentally travel to prehistoric Earth. Unable to return, they make friends with cave-people. When they do return, they inadvertently bring some with them, who must learn to get along in the 1960s.
1966	1967	The Time Tunnel	Irwin Allen	In a demonstration, a scientist turns on the experimental time tunnel, where he finds himself on board the R.M.S. Titanic. Another joins him and both are stuck in time. Each week, they have a new adventure in history.
1970	1971	Catweazle	Richard Carpenter	An 11th-century wizard accidentally travels to 1969 England. He makes many humorous mistakes while trying to find his way back home.
1970	1971	Timeslip	John Cooper	Two time-traveling children visit both the past and future.
1972	1972	Time Traveller	Yasutaka Tsutsui	Based on Yasutaka Tsutsui's 1965 novel The Girl Who Leapt Through Time. A high-school girl accidentally acquires the ability to travel through time, which leads to her reliving multiple time loops.
1974	1976	Land of the Lost	Sid & Marty Krofft	A family are trapped in an alternate universe inhabited by dinosaurs, a primate-type people called Pakuni, and aggressive humanoid lizard creatures called Sleestak.
1979	1982	Sapphire & Steel	Peter J. Hammond	Two time-traveling, inter-dimensional agents protect and guard the order of time in this British drama.
1980	1981	Baldios	Akiyoshi Sakai	Anime series featuring a Super Robot. Aliens from the ravaged planet S-1 fight against 2100s earthlings, in order to conquer Earth. In the end, it is revealed that the war is based on a predestination paradox, where Earth eventually becomes S-1, and the aliens discover to be earthlings coming from the far future, with no knowledge of the real past of their planet.
1982	1983	Voyagers!	James D. Parriott	A member of a league of time travelers, called Voyagers, and a boy travel through time repairing errors in world history.
1986	1986	Outlaws	Nicholas Corea	Five cowboys of the 1880s are sent to 1986 by a lightning strike. With no way to get back home, they start a detective agency to make a living.
1988	1988	Moondial	Helen Cresswell	A girl travels to the past with the help of a moondial, where she meets two children from earlier centuries and helps them with their unhappy lives.
1988	2017	Red Dwarf	Rob Grant & Doug Naylor	After 3 million years, Dave Lister leaves stasis as the last human being alive. He is aboard the ship Red Dwarf, in deep space and travelling at nearly the speed of light. Time travel is frequent in the series – usually into the past.
1988	1999	Mystery Science Theater 3000	Joel Hodgson	In the later seasons, Mike Nelson and his robot co-stars find themselves traveling through time, ending up in places including ancient Rome. Additionally, throughout the series, films with time travel as a major theme are shown.
1988	1989	Gunbuster	Hideaki Anno	Follows a group of pilots controlling advanced mech suits fighting aliens attempting to destroy the human race, often experiencing time dilation.
1989	1992	Dragon Ball Z	Akira Toriyama	Trunks, the son of Vegeta and Bulma, travels back in time to warn Goku of the arrival of Dr. Gero and his androids and to prevent his death from a heart virus.
1989	1993	Quantum Leap	Donald P. Bellisario	Dr. Sam Beckett becomes stuck in his past during a time-travel experiment and, in trying to return to the present time, temporarily takes the place of other people and corrects historical mistakes, thus triggering the next time jump. In his travels, he is aided by a hologram of his friend, Al.
1990	1991	Bill & Ted's Excellent Adventures		An animated spin-off of the films Bill & Ted's Excellent Adventure and Bill & Ted's Bogus Journey.
1991	1992	Back to the Future: The Animated Series	Bob Gale	An animated spin-off set after Back to the Future Part III.
1992	1993	Bill & Ted's Excellent Adventures		A live action spin-off of the films Bill & Ted's Excellent Adventure and Bill & Ted's Bogus Journey.
1993	1999	Goodnight Sweetheart	Laurence Marks and Maurice Gran	An accidental time traveller, Gary Sparrow, leads a double life after discovering a time portal allowing him to travel between 1990s London and wartime London of 1939–1945.
1993	1994	Time Trax	Creators: Harve Bennett, Jeffrey M. Hayes, Grant Rosenberg·	A police officer from the 22nd century (Dale Midkiff) travels to the present time to track down fugitives from the future.
1994	1994	Toki o Kakeru Shōjo	Yasutaka Tsutsui, Ryoichi Kimizuka	Based on Yasutaka Tsutsui's 1965 novel The Girl Who Leapt Through Time. A high-school girl accidentally acquires the ability to travel through time, which leads to her reliving multiple time loops.
1996	1999	Beast Wars: Transformers	Bob Forward, Larry DiTillio	Sequel to The Transformers. In prehistoric Earth, Predacon leader Megatron plots to change history, ensuring Predacon dominance in the future.
1997	1997	Crime Traveller	Anthony Horowitz	Jeff Slade (Michael French) uses a time machine to witness crimes in the past, then solve them in the present.
1998	2001	Seven Days	Christopher & Zachary Crowe	A secret branch of the NSA uses a time machine to travel back in time to avert disasters. The machine, which was found at Roswell, New Mexico, can only jump back seven days.
1999	2001	Twice in a Lifetime	Steve Sohmer	Individuals who have reached the end of their lives in one timeline are given three days to travel into their past and convince their younger selves to make a different choice at a pivotal point in their lives.
1999	2006	Lorong Waktu	Deddy Mizwar	Ramadan TV series. Islamic adventure of a Ustād who found a time machine.
2000	2001	Mirai Sentai Timeranger		Four police officers travel from the year 3000 to the year 2000 to arrest time fugitives.
2000	2005	Andromeda	Creators: Robert Hewitt Wolfe and based on unused concepts by Gene Roddenberry	Follows Captain Dylan Hunt after he travels 300 years into the future as the result of time dilation and finds the galactic system he has lived under has been overturned for 300 years, leaving the universe in chaos. He must use his knowledge of the past, as well as a new crew, to once again bring balance to the galaxy. Time dilation frequently appears within the series, but normal time travel is used once.
2000	2006	Star Trek: Enterprise	Creators: Rick Berman, Brannon Braga	Various species from the 30th century fight a "Temporal Cold War" that is interfering with life in the 22nd century, which affects the lives of the crew of the Enterprise (NX-01).
2001	2004	Samurai Jack	Genndy Tartakovsky	The ancient demon Aku throws the hero, Samurai Jack, into the future. Jack fights against Aku and his forces while seeking a way to return to his own time.
2001	2003	Time Squad	Dave Wasson	Time cops from the year 1,000,000,000 AD travel back in time to keep famous historical figures from diverting the course of history. A Cartoon Network series.
2001	2001	Power Rangers Time Force		Four police officers travel from the year 3000 to the year 2001 to arrest time fugitives. American adaptation of Mirai Sentai Timeranger.
2001	2001	A Step into the Past		A 21st-century Hong Kong VIPPU Inspector travels back in time to the Warring States period of ancient China.
2002	2004	Odyssey 5	Manny Coto, David Carson	After witnessing the destruction of Earth from space, five astronauts are sent back in time to determine how the earth was destroyed and prevent it from happening.
2002	2003	Do Over	Rick Wiener and Kenny Schwarz	Joel Larsen (Penn Badgley), age 34, has an accident that sends him back to 1981, when he was 14. He awakes in his teenage body, with his adult memories intact. With adult wisdom, though hampered by adolescent urges, Joel sets out to right the wrongs that will befall his family.
2002	2002	That Was Then	Dan Cohn, Jeff Kline, Jeremy Miller	A 30-year-old who regrets his mistakes from the past, finds himself back in high school, getting a chance to do things over.
2003	2005	Tru Calling	Jon Harmon Feldman	A young woman (Eliza Dushku) who works in the city morgue receives requests from corpses to stop their untimely deaths and then wakes up the day before, in order to attempt to save them.
2004	2004	5ive Days to Midnight	Robert Zappia, David Aaron Cohen, Anthony Peckham and Cindy Myers	When college professor J.T. Neumeyer (Timothy Hutton) discovers a police file that outlines the details of his murder – which is to take place five days in the future – he attempts to save his own life.
2004	2010	Lost	J. J. Abrams, Damon Lindelof & Carlton Cuse	Survivors of a plane crash on a mysterious island in the South Pacific Ocean. Desmond Hume becomes "unstuck in time" due to electromagnetic radiation. Other characters jump erratically forwards and backwards through time.
2004	2006	Phil of the Future	Tim Maile and Douglas Tuber	A family from the future is stranded in the present and attempts to repair their spaceship while maintaining the appearance of being normal people.
2006	2007	Transformers: Cybertron		The Autobot Vector Prime is a defender of space-time.
2005	2007	Time Warp Trio	Executive producer: Jim Rapsas	A children's animated series where, using books, three children travel through time and space. Based on the books by Jon Scieszka.
2006	2011	Torchwood	Russell T Davies; Chris Chibnall; Jane Espenson; John Fay	Humans and aliens from different periods in time start to come to Earth by means of a rift in the space/time continuum. Spin-off of Doctor Who.
2006	2010	Heroes	Tim Kring	Three heroes can travel in time, using their abilities in an attempt to prevent disasters.
2006	2007	Life on Mars	Matthew Graham; Ashley Pharoah; Tony Jordan; Chris Chibnall	A police officer must learn to adapt to the 1970s after being thrown back in time by an accident. The U.S. version of the series, Life on Mars, starring Jason O'Mara, aired in 2008–2009.
2006	2007	Day Break	Paul Zbyszewski	A policeman must relive the day when his girlfriend gets murdered so that he can prevent it from happening. A suspenseful variation on the Groundhog Day concept.
2007	2011	Primeval		Portals to different time periods start opening up and creatures from the past and future come through. It is implied that the portals are man-made, but their exact origin is shrouded in mystery.
2007	2008	Kamen Rider Den-O		Evil creatures called the Imagin come from a possible future to kill a human whose existence dooms them. They grant wishes to weak-willed humans, which allows them to travel farther back in time.
2007	2007	Journeyman	Kevin Falls; Matt McGuinness; Tom Szentgyörgyi	A man finds himself jumping through time, unable to stop or control the jumps. A woman from 1948 also jumps into the future, and, unable to jump home, begins a legal career. They fall in love, but she jumps back home. For unknown reasons, they now jump to the same times, and she offers him advice and assistance.
2008	2008	New Amsterdam	Allan Loeb and Christian Taylor	John Amsterdam, a detective with the New York Police Department, is actually a 400-year-old Dutch settler of the city, then known as New Amsterdam. Granted immortality after a heroic deed, he has led several dozen lives, giving him knowledge that helps him solve crimes in modern New York City.
2008	2010	Ashes to Ashes	Matthew Graham; Ashley Pharoah; Julie Rutterford; Mark Greig; Jack Lothian	A spin-off series from Life on Mars in which Alex Drake, a police officer with the London Metropolitan Police, who is shot in 2008, awakes in 1981 where she meets characters from the original Life on Mars series.
2008	2009	Kamen Rider Kiva		In parallel storylines in 1986 and 2008, a time traveler has to prevent his own birth so that his love may live, but instead ensures his own existence by saving his father from being killed by the series' antagonist.
2008	2012	Fringe		In season 4 and 5 of Fringe, time travel is used by the Observers as a means to take over human civilization in 2015. Olivia and her team are sent from the year 2015 to the year 2036 to fight off the Observers.
2008	2009	Terminator: The Sarah Connor Chronicles		A female Terminator from the year 2027 travels back to 1999 to protect a young John Connor, the future leader of the human resistance. They move in time to hide him, but find enemies wherever they go.
2009	2017	Dinosaur Train	Craig Bartlett	A Tyrannosaurus named Buddy travels with his adopted Pteranodon family on the Dinosaur Train, which can visit the entire Mesozoic Era, the "Age of Dinosaurs", passing through magical Time Tunnels to meet dinosaurs in Triassic, Jurassic, and Cretaceous times.
2009	2009	Paradox	Lizzie Mickery	Detectives investigate images being broadcast to the laboratory of eminent astrophysicist, Dr. Christian King (Emun Elliott), which appear to show catastrophic events in the future.
2009	2011	Being Erica	Jana Sinyor	Erica Strange begins seeing a counselor to deal with regrets in her life, only to discover that the counselor (Michael Riley) has the ability to send her back in time to change these events.
2009	2010	FlashForward	Brannon Braga and David S. Goyer	An incident renders the entire population of Earth unconscious for two minutes in 2009. During the "Black Out", the consciousness of the entire planet shifts forward six months into the future, where they see what could occur that day.
2010	2012	Mary Shelley's Frankenhole	Dino Stamotopolous	Dr. Victor Frankenstein has created "Frankenholes" to every time period of the past and the future. This allows historical figures and celebrities to seek the doctor's services. Although many classic horror monsters are present, the series' focus is on the mad scientist and his family.
2011	2011	Hoops & Yoyo Ruin Christmas		In a TV special, Hoops and Yoyo accidentally travel through a wormhole and meet Santa Claus when he was still Kris Kringle.
2011	2011	Puella Magi Madoka Magica	Gen Urobuchi	A mysterious girl, Homura Akemi, makes a contract with a being known as Kyubey to become a magical girl and repeatedly travel back in time to save the titular character, Madoka Kaname.
2011	2011	Terra Nova		When Earth is threatened with extinction in 2149, specially-selected humans travel back 85 million years in hopes of preventing the disaster. However, they arrive on a parallel version of Earth, thus avoiding a temporal paradox.
2011	2011	Steins;Gate	Chiyomaru Shikura	Rintaro Okabe, a self-proclaimed "mad scientist", discovers that a new cell phone-operated microwave oven can send text messages back in time. A friend adapts it to send memories, effectively allowing time travel.
2011	2018	Once Upon a Time	Edward Kitsis and Adam Horowitz	Storybook characters from the New Enchanted Forest fall into a magical portal created by a time-traveling spell to the Land Without Magic (our world) and a causal loop.
2012	2012	Primeval: New World		A Canadian spin-off series to Primeval in which a team of specialists deal with animals and people from other times who have travelled to present day through anomalies.
2012	2015	Continuum		A series on the conflict between a police officer representing future corporations, and a group of anti-corporate rebels, each from the year 2077, who time-travel to Vancouver, BC around the year 2012.
2013	2022	Attack on Titan	Hajime Isayama	The main character of the series, Eren Jaeger, and his brother Zeke, travel back in time through their father's memories through the power of the Founding Titan. Zeke attempts to convince his brother of their father's priority of the Eldian Restorationist movement above all else, but is shocked to learn of his role in persuading Grisha into slaughtering the Reiss family, the Attack Titan's ability to see the memories of its future inheritors, and of the future memories Eren showed their father.
2014	–	Outlander	Based on Diana Gabaldon's Outlander series	A woman from the 1940s time travels through standing stones in Scotland to the 1740s.
2014	2023	The Flash	Based on the DC Comics character Flash	Barry Allen, a crime scene investigator who gains the power to move at superhuman speeds, becomes a superhero crime-fighter known as the Flash. It is a spin-off from Arrow, existing in the same DC universe.
2015	2018	12 Monkeys	Terry Matalas and Travis Fickett	Time traveler James Cole travels from the year 2043 to the present day to stop the release of a deadly virus by the enigmatic organization known as "The Army of the Twelve Monkeys".
2015	2020	El ministerio del tiempo	Pablo Olivares and Javier Olivares	The Ministry of Time is a Spanish government institution. Its patrols watch the doors of time so intruders from other eras cannot change history for their own benefit.
2016	2016	Erased	Kei Sanbe	Satoru Fujinuma possesses an ability called "Revival", which sends his consciousness back in time moments before a life-threatening incident. After his mother is murdered, he travels back in time to eighteen years ago, when he was in elementary school, and attempts to prevent her murder as well as that of three of his childhood friends.
2016	2022	Legends of Tomorrow	Based on the DC Comics characters	Time Master Rip Hunter travels back in time to the present day, where he brings together a team of heroes and villains to prevent those who would disrupt time for their benefit.
2016	2016	11.22.63	Stephen King	A man is presented with the chance to travel back in time and attempt to prevent the assassination of John F. Kennedy.
2016	–	Re:Zero − Starting Life in Another World	Tappei Nagatsuki	Subaru Natsuki is transported to another world, where he is saved by a girl named Emilia, only to be killed. He reawakens at the place in which he was reborn and discovers that he possesses an ability known as "Return by Death", which rewinds time to a certain point after his death.
2016	2019	Milo Murphy's Law	Dan Povenmire, Jeff "Swampy" Marsh	Bureau of Time Travel Agents from the future travel back in time to prevent pistachios from going extinct.
2016	2018	Timeless	Shawn Ryan, Eric Kripke	History professor, scientist, and soldier team up to stop a time-traveling criminal who seeks to change the course of American history in order to prevent the rise of a shadowy organization.
2016	2018	Travelers	Brad Wright	Hundreds of years from now, surviving humans discover how to send consciousness back through time, into people of the 21st century, while attempting to change the path of humanity.
2016	2017	Frequency	Jeremy Carver	Based on the 2000 film of the same name. In 2016, a detective discovers that she can speak to her deceased father via his old ham radio. Her attempts to save his life trigger the "butterfly effect", changing the present. To fix the damage, she must work with her father across decades to solve an old murder case.
2017	2017	Making History	Phil Lord and Christopher Miller, Julius Sharpe	Three friends from two different centuries experience the thrill of time travel and its unexpected results.
2017	2017	Time After Time	Kevin Williamson	Based on the 1979 novel of the same name, which was previously adapted as a feature film. H. G. Wells travels to 2017 on his time machine to capture Jack the Ripper.
2017	2017	Sagrada Reset	Shin'ya Kawatsura	
2017	2017	Tunnel	Choi Jin-hee, Studio Dragon	A police detective trying to find a serial killer chases a suspect through a tunnel, only to wind up 30 years in the future. The series had a Thai remake in 2019.
2017	2020	Dark	Baran bo Odar and Jantje Friese	A Netflix series; the disappearance of several locals, and other mysterious incidents around a power plant in the fictional town of Winden, Germany, spurs a mystery that occurs in 33 year cycles, starting originally in 1953, 1986, and 2019.
2017	–	Find Me in Paris		A ballerina/princess from 1905 finds herself transported to 2018.
2019	2019	Twice Upon a Time	Guillaume Nicloux	Arte/Netflix miniseries. Vincent Dauda (Gaspard Ulliel), dreams of winning back his ex, Louise (Freya Mavor). One day he is delivered a package he never ordered. A strange wooden box, without any bottom, through which he can travel through time. It just so happens to bring him back to Louise before they split up.
2020	2020	JL50	Shailender Vyas	About an Indian airplane which travels forward 35 years in time through a wormhole.
2020	2020	Mirakel		In 2020 two Swedish scientists, Vilgot and Anna-Karin, develop an artificial wormhole, also known as an artificial black hole, in an attempt to control the electricity market. It malfunctions and instead causes two girls, Mira in 2020 and Rakel in 1920, to travel through time and swap bodies with each other.
2021	2022	Time Traveler Luke		A young bellhop named Luke uses a secret elevator to travel through time and protect historical artifacts.
2021	2023	Loki	Michael Waldron	An alternate version of Loki is captured by the Time Variance Authority (TVA), whose agents travel to different points in time in order to preserve the "Sacred Timeline".
2021	–	Link Click	Li Haoling	Cheng Xiaoshi and Lu Guang work at the "Time Photo Studio," a small photography shop located in a modern metropolis. They possess the ability to enter their clientele's photos, traveling back in time to the moment the photo was taken. They use this ability to fulfill their clients' request, regardless of the danger involved, while leaving the events of the past unchanged.
2021	–	Tokyo Revengers	Ken Wakui	
2021	–	Tuttle Twins	Daniel Harmon	A grandmother takes her twin grandchildren through time on her mobility scooter to meet historical figures.
2021	–	When I Was Your Age	Banijay, Monello Productions, MoBo Productions, Rai Ragazzi	In each episode, when an adult says the words "When I was your age", the protagonist, a 10-year-old boy, gets transported to a point in time when the adult was 10 years old and has to help them with something in order to return to the present.
2022	2022	Again My Life	Han Chul-soo, Kim Yong-min	A young prosecutor who gets killed while trying to take down a powerful corrupted politician had his consciousness sent back to 15 years ago by a female Grim Reaper, in order to pursue justice.
2022	–	Midnight at the Pera Palace		Modern-day journalist Esra finds herself thrust back into 1919 via a portal in the historic Pera Palace Hotel and must attempt to foil a plot there which could change the course of Turkish history.
2022	2022	Summer Time Rendering		In his attempts to overcome the mysterious phenomena afflicting his hometown of Hitogashima, Shinpei Ajiro must often restart from "save points" after being killed. The mechanics of time travel and its interactions with said phenomena present Shinpei with both peril and opportunity.
2022	2022	The Time Traveler's Wife	Steven Moffat	A romantic drama about a man with a genetic disorder which causes him to sporadically travel through time for short periods, and the complications it creates for his marriage. Based on the Audrey Niffenegger novel.
2023	2023	Scott Pilgrim Takes Off		The titular character, Scott Pilgrim, is taken to the future by his older self during his fight with Matthew Patel in order to prevent his relationship with Ramona Flowers and his subsequent battles with her Seven Evil Exes from happening. Present Scott is able to return home thanks to a future version of Ramona, but the lives of his friends and the Exes change after initially believing him dead, with the former now reformed after getting full closure from the previous relationships with Ramona.
2023	2023	Bodies	Paul Tomalin	The story starts with the appearance of a dead body in Longharvest Lane in the Whitechapel area of London. This event happens in the same location in four years – 1890, 1941, 2023 and 2053 – and leads to four investigations by Metropolitan Police detectives that eventually become interlinked, with far-reaching consequences.

=== Game shows ===
Start date	End date	Title	Production company	Description
1993	1995	Time Busters	Broadsword Productions	A group of contestants travel back in time led by Professor McNulty on a Time Bus to investigate and restore original timelines from the evil Dr. Paradox and his time vandals.

== Video games ==
Year	Title	Developer(s)	Description
1993	Sonic CD	Sonic Team	Time travel is a central game mechanic, where Sonic can travel to the past to change the future in each of the game's stages, with the aim of turning "bad futures" into "good futures."
1995	Chrono Trigger	Square	Follows protagonist Crono and his companions, who travel through time to stop Lavos and prevent a global catastrophe.
1998	The Legend of Zelda: Ocarina of Time	Nintendo	Link, as both his child and adult selves, travels back and forth in time 7 years by placing and pulling the Master Sword in and from the Pedestal of Time in order to prevent Ganondorf from seizing the Triforce and taking over Hyrule.
2000	The Legend of Zelda: Majora's Mask	Nintendo	Link travels in a 3-day time loop in order to prevent Majora from crashing the Moon into Termina.
2002–present	Kingdom Hearts series	Square	Time travel is a recurring element throughout the series, most notably the world of Timeless River, which is the past of Disney Castle prior to its founding, and with Xehanort, who uses the ability to time travel in order to assemble versions of himself from across time, including his younger self, known as Young Xehanort.
2005	Mario & Luigi: Partners in Time	Nintendo	Mario and Luigi travel back in time to save the Mushroom Kingdom from the Shroobs.
2011	The Legend of Zelda: Skyward Sword	Nintendo	Link travels back and forth between the present and the distant past in order to prevent Ghirahim from resurrecting the Demon King Demise and seizing the Triforce.
2013	No One Has to Die	Sammy Madafiglio	The player, known as the 'Visitor', attempts to assist four other victims of a fire at a corporate headquarter, with only one person seemingly being able to survive in each iteration of a time loop.
2015	Life is Strange	Don't Nod	The protagonist, Max Caulfield, has the supernatural ability to reverse time, allowing her to alter her choices and act upon information obtained in alternate versions of events, affecting the narrative and the fates of herself and other characters in the story.
2019	Outer Wilds	Mobius Digital	The player, a space explorer referred to as the Hatchling, explores the ruins of the Nomai in a solar system stuck in a 22-minute time loop, attempting to discover the history of the Nomai and the cause of the time loop.
2021	Twelve Minutes	Annapurna Interactive	A husband must repeat the events of the titular 12-minute cycle to solve the mystery of his pregnant wife and the accusation that she murdered a man's father.
2023	In Stars and Time	Armor Games Studios	Siffrin repeats the same two days, trying to save the country from the villainous King and break free from the time loop. The loop is later revealed to have been started by Siffrin themselves, who wished to stay with their party after defeating the King.
2023	WarioWare: Move It!	Nintendo	Dr. Crygor uses his latest invention, the Time Obliterator 5.0, which resembles a stopwatch, with his granddaughter Penny and the karaoke robot Mike, to time warp to Underarm Jungle and travel back in time to the Stone Age. There, they encounter dinosaurs and mammoths while seeing how the paintings and rock art were made by a caveman named the Caresawayan.
2023	The Legend of Zelda: Tears of the Kingdom	Nintendo	The story begins with the disappearance of Princess Zelda following the reawakening of Ganondorf; she is later revealed to have been transported to the distant past by the power of her Secret Stone, where she met Rauru and his wife Sonia, the first king and queen of Hyrule. She fought alongside them and the Sages against Ganondorf in the Imprisoning War; after Rauru sacrificed himself to seal Ganondorf away, Zelda, who received the broken Master Sword from Link in the present, swallowed her Secret Stone and underwent the process of draconification. She became the Light Dragon, repairing the sword with sacred power for Link to recover in the present.
2024	Not For Broadcast: The Timeloop DLC	NotGames	The player, stuck in a time loop with his boss during the so-called "Night of Smiles", must solve the mystery unfolding within the newsroom related to that day's special guest.

== Music ==
Year	Title	Composer	Artist	Description
1976	"'39"	Brian May	Queen	A group of astronauts embark on what is, from their perspective, a year-long voyage. Upon their return however, they realize that a hundred years have passed on Earth due to the effects of time dilation.
2002	"Year 3000"	James Bourne, Charlie Simpson, Steve Robson and Matt Willis	Busted	The narrator visits the year 3000 using a time machine built by his neighbour, Peter, and sees that humanity now lives underwater.

== See also ==
- List of films featuring time loops
- Chuanyue
