= Neverwas (novel) =

2014 novel

- First edition cover of Neverwas
- Author: Kelly Moore; Tucker Reed; Larkin Reed
- Cover artist: Whitney Lyle (design); Shane Rebenschied (art)
- Language: English
- Series: The Amber House Trilogy
- Genre: Young adult Alternate history Dystopian; Gothic horror Romance novel Time travel
- Publisher: Arthur A. Levine Books
- Publication date: 7 January 2014
- Publication place: United States
- Media type: Print (Hardcover, Paperback) e-Book (Kindle); Audiobook
- Pages: 320
- ISBN: 0-545-43418-1
- Preceded by: Amber House (2012)
- Followed by: Otherwhen (2017 or 2018)

Neverwas is the second novel in the Amber House Trilogy by American author Kelly Moore and her daughters Tucker Reed and Larkin Reed. The book follows narrator Sarah Parsons, who discovers she has altered the course of history through the use of a psychic ability that has been passed down through the women living at the family's ancestral estate outside of Annapolis, Maryland.

Neverwas is a young adult paranormal mystery novel set in a dystopian alternate history. The books setting is in a mid-twentieth century United States with an undefeated Confederacy to examine issues such as racism, sexism, and xenophobia.

== Plot summary ==
Picking up three months after Amber House left off, Sarah and her family relocate from the Pacific Northwestern nation of Astoria to live at Amber House with her aunt Maggie. Unbeknownst to Sarah, her actions at the end of Amber House propelled her and her loved ones into an alternate reality: North America is a collection of separate nations—including the American Confederation of States, which still struggles with segregation and sexism—and Nazis control all of Europe.

With little recollection of what happened in Amber House, Sarah must rediscover her psychometric ability (which was suppressed in this timeline by her grandmother Ida and mother Anne after use of the "family gift" nearly killed Maggie) and track down "echoes" of the past that will help her remember the way things used to be. Sarah is once again thrown together with Richard Hathaway, whose senator father is about to run for the Presidency, but finds she inexplicably yearns for Jackson Harris, little knowing how close the two grew in the time before.

Sarah learns she is distantly related to both Jackson and Richard; all share Captain Joseph Foster as a common ancestor from the 1700s. A smuggler and slave owner, Foster married Sarah's ancestress Deirdre Dobson after the death of his first wife, Lydia, who died during the birth of Foster's oldest daughter, Camilla. It is from Camilla that Richard is descended, from an illegitimate daughter fathered by Foster and the slave Nyangu that Jackson is descended, and from Foster and Dobson's daughter Sarah-Louise that Sarah is descended. With the help of Jackson's precognition, Sarah realizes that a mysterious artifact that belonged to the Captain and that was passed down through the generations to Richard's mother Claire Hathaway may prove vital to pinpointing how time went wrong. Sarah and Jackson ultimately attempt to reset the universe once again in a high-stakes heist in New York City.

== Publication and reception ==
Kirkus was the first to review the second novel in the trilogy; deeming it "a stark departure" from the Gothic tone of the preceding novel, Kirkus nevertheless found the "authors' vision of this alternate, broken United States" to be "inconceivably frightening" and stated Neverwas is "a wild ride that leaves its readers breathless for the final installment."
