= Deadly Medicine =

1988 book by Kelly Moore and Dan Reed

- Cover of 1991 paperback edition
- Author: Kelly Moore, Dan Reed
- Language: English
- Genre: Nonfiction, true crime
- Publisher: St. Martin's Press
- Publication date: November 1988
- Publication place: United States
- Media type: Print (hardback, paperback, audiobook)

Deadly Medicine is a 1988 non-fiction true crime book by Kelly Moore and Dan Reed that was adapted for television in 1991, as an NBC Movie-of-the-Week by the same name. The book was first published in November 1988 and focused on the murder case of convicted serial killer Genene Jones.

== Summary ==
The book chronicles the murder case of convicted serial killer Genene Jones, a pediatric nurse from San Antonio, Texas, who murdered between 11 and 46 infants during 1981 and 1982 by inducing Code Blue emergencies through fatal overdoses of prescription medications such as heparin. The book relies on interviews with the victims' families, the investigators, the attorneys, and Jones herself. The authors summarize the 1984 murder trial and theorize that Jones intentionally triggered medical issues in the infants to act as a hero during the resultant Code Blue emergencies.

== Critical reception ==
General reception for the book was positive and Deadly Medicine was a New York Times bestseller for seven weeks. The book received positive reviews, with the Los Angeles Times writing that it was "distinguished by thorough research and a keen understanding of human character—even of Jones' motivation."

Booklist specifically noted the book's "chilling veracity," deeming it "striking for the feeling of horrifying powerlessness it provokes as Jones murders again and again." According to Kirkus Reviews, Deadly Medicine is "an engrossing and readable shocker."

Deadly Medicine was listed on The Sunday Telegraph's Local Best Sellers in paperback in November 1989.

== Television adaptation ==
In 1991 the book was adapted into a made-for-television movie starring Veronica Hamel as pediatrician Kathleen Holland and Susan Ruttan as Genene Jones. Moore and Reed's book was adapted by screenwriters Vicki Polon, L. Virginia Browne, and Andrew Laskos, and directed by Richard Colla for NBC. Reception for the film was mostly positive.
