= Troisi =

Troisi is a surname of Italian origin. The name originates from the Latin Trogisii which refers to descendants of Trogisio or others of the same name. It may refer to:

- Alfonso Troisi (b. 1954), Argentine former football player
- Dante Troisi (1920–1989), Italian writer and magistrate
- James Troisi (b. 1988), Australian football (soccer) player
- Licia Troisi (b. 1980), Italian fantasy writer
- Lino Troisi (1932–1998), Italian actor
- Marcello Troisi (b. 1976), Brazilian football player
- Massimo Troisi (1953–1994), Italian actor, film director and poet
- Pietro Paolo Troisi (1686–1743), Maltese artist
- Rebecca J. Troisi, American cancer epidemiologist
