= Amber House (novel) =

2012 novel by Kelly Moore, Tucker Reed and Larkin Reed

- First edition cover of Amber House
- Author: Kelly Moore, Tucker Reed, Larkin Reed
- Cover artist: Whitney Lyle (design), Shane Rebenschied (art)
- Language: English
- Series: The Amber House Trilogy
- Genre: Young adult, Gothic horror, romance, time travel
- Publisher: Arthur A. Levine Books
- Publication date: 1 October 2012
- Publication place: United States
- Media type: Print (hardback & paperback) e-Book (Kindle); Audiobook
- Pages: 368
- ISBN: 0-545-43416-5
- Followed by: Neverwas (January 2014)

Amber House is the first book in what was initially dubbed the Amber House Trilogy by American author Kelly Moore and her daughters Tucker Reed and Larkin Reed. The book follows narrator Sarah Parsons, who discovers she has the psychic ability of psychometry, enabling her to see into her own history as she stays at her family's ancestral estate outside of Annapolis, Maryland.

Amber House is a young adult paranormal mystery novel. Critics have remained in disagreement over what genre Amber House best fits into; Kirkus Reviews dubbed it "horror romance," and Booklist cited the story's "Gothic feel," while Publishers Weekly claimed the story "straddles the lines between magical realism, fantasy, ghost stories, and horror, with a touch of romance and classic glamour." The authors categorize the book (and its sequels) as "a time travel series."

== Plot summary ==
The book begins at the funeral of Sarah's maternal grandmother, Ida. Sarah and her autistic brother, five-year-old Sammy, have never seen their mother's supposedly-haunted ancestral home; Anne was estranged from Ida, and she plans to sell Amber House and everything in it. Sarah meets her grandmother's nurse, Rose Valois, and Rose's teenaged grandson, Jackson. Sarah feels uncomfortable around Jackson because he seems to know things about her that her grandmother would have been unable to tell him due to how infrequently she and Sarah interacted while Ida was alive. Jackson mentions a local legend about a fortune of diamonds hidden in Amber House and offers to help Sarah find them. Even though Anne has already booked the family into a hotel, Sarah and Sammy conspire to hunt for the treasure and force Anne to stay in the house for the few days they will be in town.

Soon Sarah is introduced to Senator Robert Hathaway and his teenaged son Richard. Richard knows more about Amber House than Sarah does, and tells her about Deirdre Foster, the mad wife of the sea captain who lost the diamonds in the 1700s. Richard claims it is Deirdre who haunts the estate. Meanwhile, inspired by Sarah and Richard's palpable connection, Anne comes up with the idea of celebrating Sarah's sixteenth birthday, ten days off, with a masquerade ball. The event will be used to advertise the house before Anne puts it on the market.

As time goes on, Sarah finds herself spending many of her daytime hours with Richard, and many of her evening hours with Jackson. After Jackson rescues Sarah from an encounter with Deirdre Foster, Sarah confesses to seeing ghosts in Amber House. But Jackson explains that they aren't ghosts; according to Ida, they are what the house remembers, and the house tells its secrets only to the women of Sarah's family. In the days leading up to her birthday, Sarah uses her new "gift" to piece together when and why her mother and grandmother drifted apart. She uncovers secrets through visions of the women of her family that suggest she is connected to both Jackson and Richard. And when the past seems to threaten Sarah and Sammy in the present, Sarah must use her gift to find the point where "past and future meet," before the ominous happenings at Amber House end in a fresh tragedy.

== Development ==
According to interviews, Kelly Moore first started work on the story in the 1980s. Moore was influenced by Indonesian tribal beliefs and the Winchester Mystery House in San Jose, California. She attempted to adapt the idea for television in the early 1990s, first collaborating with her (then) husband Dan Reed, and later with her former sister-in-law Maureen Reed and actress Nancy Harewood. The collaboration dissolved and Moore's research for the project was stored in a box in her attic. A decade later, Tucker Reed located the box that held Moore's earliest notes on and drafts of the Amber House story. Believing the concept well-suited for young adult literature, Tucker persuaded Moore to collaborate on a novel; Moore's daughter Larkin was later included in the collaboration, as well.

The authors cite as inspiration the films Back to the Future, Jumanji, Labyrinth and The Shining, as well as an episode of the original Lost in Space television series, and Frances Hodgson Burnett's novel The Secret Garden.

== Publication and reception ==
The book was published on October 1, 2012, by Scholastic's Arthur A. Levine Books imprint.

Critical reception was positive. Kirkus Reviews praised the protagonist, saying "Move over Bella Swan, Sarah is a strong, admirable character who’d rather speak her mind than sulk and sigh over some hot guy." In a second featured review issued by Kirkus, critic Leila Roy stated: "Amber House has a wonderful hook of an opening line ... [a]nd it's got a fantastic premise." Booklist cited the "highly descriptive, lush prose" and "deft handling of family dynamics" as highlights. In starred reviews, both Publishers Weekly and the Bulletin of the Center for Children's Books described the plot as "intricate" and "swift," respectively.

Amber House was a finalist for the 2014 Oregon Book Awards for Young Adult Literature, as well as the 2014 Dolly Gray Award for its realistic and positive portrayal of a character with autism. Amber House was a featured title on the Texas Library Association's 2014 TAYSHAS List, and was featured in the 2012 and 2013 Scholastic Book Fairs.
