= Hawksbill Station =

1968 novel by Robert Silverberg

- Cover of first edition (hardcover)
- Author: Robert Silverberg
- Cover artist: Pat Steir
- Language: English
- Genre: Science fiction
- Publisher: Doubleday
- Publication date: 1968
- Publication place: United States
- Media type: Print (hardback & paperback)
- Pages: 166
- OCLC: 42141711

Hawksbill Station is a science fiction novel by American writer Robert Silverberg. The novel is an expanded version of a short story first published in Galaxy Science Fiction in August 1967. The novel was published in 1968 and was released in the United Kingdom under the title The Anvil of Time.

== Synopsis ==
Hawksbill Station was a penal colony in the Cambrian Period created by an authoritarian United States government, using time travel to exile rebels and political dissidents into the past. The colony houses only male exiles, who are sent there as a "humane" alternative to execution. The machine only works one way, leaving prisoners marooned in the past.

The prison is set in a barren coastal area. The novel focuses on the relationships between the main character, the de facto leader of the colony, and his nemesis in the government, Jacob “Jack” Bernstein, both of whom were leading dissidents. It also explores the petty ideological differences among the prisoners and the confused circumstances leading to the establishment of the authoritarian government.

The prisoners, all middle-aged or elderly, are surprised by the arrival of a much younger prisoner. The newcomer, supposedly an economist, is questioned about economic theory and political ideology. His answers reveal his essential ignorance of both. This ignorance, combined with his youth, cause the prisoners to wonder if he is, in fact, a political prisoner or a common criminal, exiled for a heinous crime.

When the newcomer arrives via the time machine a second time, it is revealed that he is a police officer of a new government that overthrew the authoritarian government but was unrelated to the dissident movements of the exiles. The new government discovered the existence of Hawksbill Station and a way to travel from past to future, making it possible to retrieve prisoners from the colony. The newcomer has been sent to evaluate the prisoners and to recommend whether they are appropriate for retrieval.

With return now possible, the leader of the exiles realizes that he is a time traveler of a different sort. The struggle against the authoritarian government, his life's work, is over. His closest friends in the movement, as well as his most bitter enemies, are dead. He is tempted to visit the newcomer's future, but Hawksbill Station is now the only existence he knows.

== Reception ==
Algis Budrys said that Hawksbill Station was Silverberg's best story.

Hawksbill Station was credited by game developer Jeff Vogel as having influenced the design of his game Exile: Escape from the Pit.

== Sources ==
- Peter Nicholls. The Encyclopedia of Science Fiction. London: Roxby Press Limited, 1979. ISBN 0-385-14743-0.
- Clute, John with Peter Nicholls. The Encyclopedia of Science Fiction. New York: St. Martin's Griffin, 1993 (2nd edition 1995). ISBN 0-312-13486-X.
