= Amber House Trilogy =

Young adult series

- Amber House (2012), book 1 of the series
- Amber House; Neverwas; Ever Shall; Otherwhen
- Author: Kelly Moore; Tucker Reed; Larkin Reed
- Cover artist: Whitney Lyle (design); Shane Rebenschied (art)
- Country: United States
- Language: English
- Genre: Young adult fiction Alternate history Gothic horror Fantasy; Magical realism Romance; Supernatural thriller Time travel
- Publisher: Arthur A. Levine Books
- Published: 2012
- Media type: Print

The Amber House Trilogy is a series of young adult books by American author Kelly Moore and her daughters Tucker Reed and Larkin Reed. The first book in the series, Amber House, was published on October 1, 2012, through Arthur A. Levine Books. Amber House has been licensed in South America and Europe. It was a featured title in the 2012 Scholastic Book Fair. Its sequel, Neverwas, was released on January 7, 2014. Official publication dates for a third installment in the series, Ever Shall, and a fourth and final installment, Otherwhen, have not been announced as of early 2025.

== Premise ==
The series follows Sarah, a teenager staying at her family's allegedly-haunted centuries-old estate near Annapolis, Maryland. Sarah learns the women of her family possess psychic abilities that enable them to see "echoes" of the past. These ghostly visions date back to the mid-1600s when Sarah's Irish immigrant ancestors, former indentured servants, built the house. The ability of a neighboring family to see premonitions of the future allows for time-bending possibilities Sarah and her loved ones must choose either to pursue or reject. The series is classified as paranormal-romance, with elements of horror, science fiction, magical realism, and alternate history.

== Novels ==
=== Ever Shall ===
On July 7, 2017, an "anniversary announcement" on the series' official website and official Facebook page, celebrating the anniversary of the publication of Neverwas, also announced that the mother-daughter writing trio had decided to "halve" their manuscript for Otherwhen in order to, among other things, show Sarah during all four seasons of her first year in Amber House, bringing things "full circle." The series will likely no longer be referred to as The Amber House Trilogy. Due to the murder committed by one of the authors in 2016, the series has been on indefinite suspension.

=== Otherwhen ===
The title of the final installment is a reference to the poem penned by Sarah's great-grandmother Fiona, featured in the first book of the series.

== Reception ==
Critical reception for Amber House has been positive, with Kirkus Reviews praising the character of Sarah. Publishers Weekly and the Bulletin of the Center for Children's Books also gave starred reviews, with Publishers Weekly citing the book's "lush descriptions" and "intricate plot" as a highlight. Amber House is a finalist for the 2014 Oregon Book Awards for Young Adult Literature. The book was also selected by the Texas Library Association as a featured title on their 2014 TAYSHAS List.

In November 2013, Kirkus Reviews was the first to review the second novel in the trilogy, deeming Neverwas "a stark departure" from the Gothic tone of the preceding the novel, but nevertheless praising its "inconceivably frightening" alternate timeline setting.
