= Tucker Reed =

Former novelist convicted of manslaughter (born 1989)

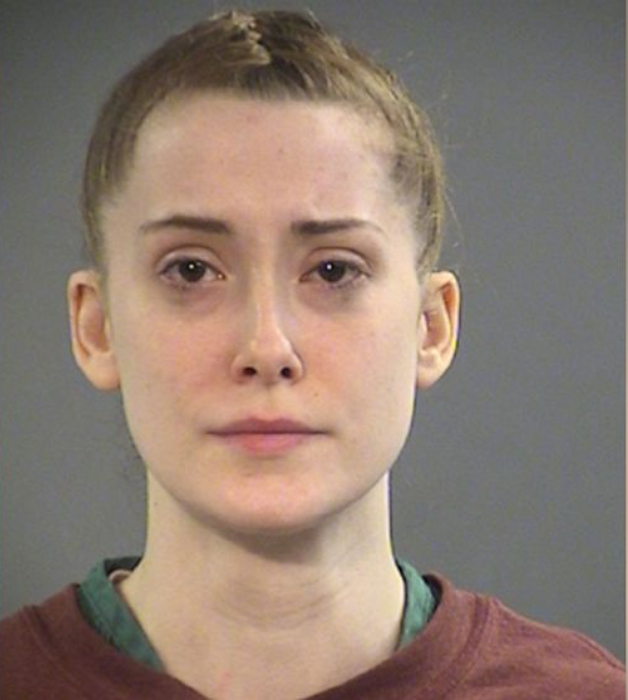
- Tucker Reed's booking photo from the Jackson County Sherriff's office
- Born: Aisling Tucker Moore-Reed; October 15, 1989 (age 36); Los Gatos, California, U.S.
- Education: University of Southern California
- Occupations: Novelist, journalist, blogger, actress
- Writing career
- Pen name: Wyn Reed, Tucker Reed
- Genres: Gothic horror, time travel, alternate history
- Notable works: Amber House (2012); Neverwas (2014)

Aisling Tucker Moore-Reed (born October 15, 1989), known by her pen name Tucker Reed, is a former amateur novelist and actress who was convicted of manslaughter in May 2020. Reed co-authored the young adult novel Amber House published in October 2012 and its sequel Neverwas, released internationally in January 2014.

Reed's allegations of being raped resulted in her liability for defamation. In May 2020, she was convicted of manslaughter for killing her uncle after shooting him in July 2016. She was sentenced to six years and three months in prison.

== Early life ==
Aisling Tucker Moore-Reed was born in Los Gatos, California, Santa Clara County. She is the daughter of The New York Times best-selling author Kelly Moore and English teacher Daniel Reed. Through her maternal grandfather, United States Navy Commander Lundi Addison Moore, she claims descent from Plymouth Colony settler and Mayflower Compact signer Stephen Hopkins.

She attended Ashland High School in Oregon. As a teenager, Reed gigged with an alternative rock band as a singer-songwriter, and performed lead roles in, as well as designed sets and costumes for, school and community theater productions. She also served as a reporter, web designer and editor-in-chief for her high school's newspaper, The Rogue News. Reed went on to be recognized on the national level for her essays and short stories during her junior and senior years at Ashland High School.

In 2009, at age 19, Reed persuaded her mother to collaborate on a novel. Reed's sister Larkin was later included in the collaboration as well. In 2011, the trio negotiated and received a reported six-figure financial deal with the Arthur A. Levine imprint of Scholastic Press for the North American rights to their planned Amber House Trilogy.

== Education ==
In 2010, Reed attended the University of Southern California, where she was a reporter and assistant editor for the university's student newspaper, the Daily Trojan, in 2010. In 2014, Reed dropped out of USC.

== Career ==
Reed and younger sister Larkin, with their mother Kelly Moore, co-authored Amber House, the first installment of the Amber House trilogy, which was released by Scholastic's Arthur A. Levine Books imprint on October 1, 2012. Amber House received a positive critical reception, with Publishers Weekly praising the book's plot and originality, dubbing the story "rich, strange, and utterly fascinating." Kirkus Reviews singled out the book's heroine as being a "strong, admirable character" for young female readers, contrasting her with Bella Swan from the Twilight franchise.

Amber House was a finalist for the 2014 Oregon Book Award for Young Adult Literature, and was selected for the Texas Library Association's 2014 TAYSHAS List. Reed acted as narrator of the audiobook edition of Amber House and its sequel Neverwas, which was released on January 7, 2014. Reed is also co-author of the series' forthcoming titles Ever Shall and Otherwhen.

In early 2016, she worked as a reporter for The Grants Pass Daily Courier before quitting in the spring.

Reed also played the lead role in an independent horror movie released November 20, 2020, titled From the Dark, under the stage name Wyn Reed.

== Self-identified survivor of unsubstantiated gendered violence ==
Reed first gained notoriety as an opponent of gendered violence (specifically sexual abuse against women) when she published the name of her alleged assaulter to a blog. According to Reed's blog, in 2013 the USC Student Judicial Affairs and Community Standards office deemed "the burden of proof was not reached to find that a violation of the Student Conduct Code occurred." The case was later rejected by the LAPD, a private investigator, and the LA District Attorney. Reed was found liable for defamation in a counter-suit. Australian criminologist and feminist Anastasia Powell identified Reed in 2015 as one of several women who used the internet to engage in what would traditionally be deemed "vigilante" behavior in "resistance to rape culture" in Rape Justice: Beyond the Criminal Law.

In September 2013, Reed spoke out as a proponent of "mandatory exit surveys" at college campuses, designed to better monitor the efficacy of policies and programs regarding student safety. Such surveys would, according to Reed, prevent internal corruption and dismissal of valid student claims because they would create an external reference monitoring whether colleges remain in compliance with the Clery Act and their own safety policies.

=== Activism and self-advocacy ===
In 2013, Reed aided students at multiple institutions in filing Office for Civil Rights complaints against their colleges.

Reed helped to organize college students in support of women's rights and to raise public awareness about the issue of gendered violence, appearing on CNN, CBS, NBC, HuffPost Live and other news programs. Reed founded the Student Coalition Against Rape (SCAR), originally a sub-org at the University of Southern California and now a national organization. Reed has stated her hope "that, ultimately, sexual aggression will become as socially unacceptable as smoking in a crowded room."

Since late 2012, Reed has blogged for xoJane.com and the Huffington Post, and written for Cosmopolitan magazine.

== Murder and drug charges ==
On July 26, 2016, Reed was arrested in connection with the fatal shooting of her 63-year-old maternal uncle, Shane Patrick Moore; this occurred at his parents' home in Applegate, Oregon. On July 29, 2016, Reed was indicted on charges of first and second degree manslaughter by a grand jury. Reed's bail was set at $200,000. When approached by the press, Reed's mother, Kelly Moore, said her daughter was protecting her against the uncle.

On September 5, 2018, Reed also faced a charge of 2nd degree murder atop felony counts of first- and second- degree manslaughter of her uncle based on "some new evidence" that had surfaced, according to Deputy District Attorney Marco Boccato, who prosecuted the case with District Attorney Beth Heckert.

In January 2020, Reed faced charges of supplying contraband and unlawfully possessing heroin in jail. She was housed at Jackson County Jail at the time.

On May 27, 2020, Reed pleaded guilty to a charge of second degree manslaughter in the death of her uncle. She was sentenced to six years, three months in prison. As terms of the plea deal, the charges of first degree manslaughter and second degree murder were dropped. She is incarcerated at Coffee Creek Correctional Facility in Wilsonville. In January 2021, Reed filed a malpractice lawsuit against her defense attorney alleging he failed to adequately represent her and caused her to accept a false plea deal that was not voluntary. The lawsuit was dismissed by the court in May 2021.

In October 2020, Dateline NBC introduced a podcast about Reed's killing of her uncle, entitled "Killer Role".

The following year, Snapped aired an episode that profiled the case.

According to the NBC documentary, she was released in November 2024.
