= Rebecca J. Troisi =

American epidemiologist

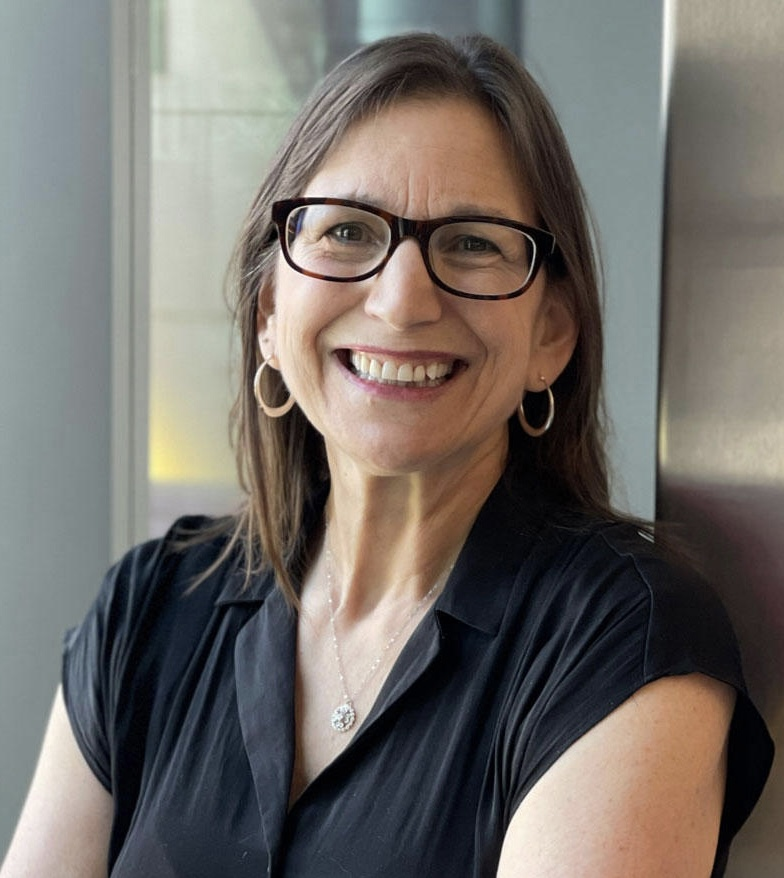
- Education: Harvard T.H. Chan School of Public Health
- Scientific career
- Fields: Cancer epidemiology
- Institutions: National Cancer Institute

Rebecca J. Troisi is an American cancer epidemiologist specialized in the hormonal etiologies of reproductive cancers. She was a senior associate scientist in the trans-divisional research program at the National Cancer Institute before retiring in 2026.

== Life ==
Troisi completed a Sc.D. from the Harvard T.H. Chan School of Public Health in 1994. Her dissertation was titled, Epidemiology of adult-onset asthma. She joined the National Cancer Institute (NCI) the same year. Her research has focused on the hormonal etiologies of reproductive cancers and the role of maternal, gestational, neonatal and early life factors in breast cancer risk, including endocrine disruptors such as diethylstilbestrol, a drug previously given to pregnant women. Troisi and colleagues Marlene Goldman and Kathryn Rexrode edited the second edition of Women and Health, a comprehensive review of the behavioral, social, and biological determinants of health and well-being in women, published in late 2012 and the third edition published in 2026 by Elsevier. Troisi was a senior associate scientist in the trans-divisional research program in the NCI division of cancer epidemiology and genetics before retiring in 2026.

== Selected works ==
- Goldman, Marlene B.; Troisi, Rebecca; Rexrode, Kathryn M., eds. (2012). Women and Health (2nd ed.). Elsevier Science. ISBN 978-0-12-384979-3.
- Troisi, Rebecca; Rexrode, Kathryn M.; Cozier, Yvette C.; Goldman, Marlene B., eds. (2026). Women and Health (3rd ed.). Elsevier Science.
