= Kelly Moore (writer) =

American writer

- Born: August 30, 1956 (age 70); Manchester Township, New Jersey, U.S.
- Education: Santa Clara University, University of California, Berkeley School of Law
- Occupations: Author, Lawyer (retired)
- Spouse: Dan Reed (divorced)
- Children: Tucker Reed, Larkin Reed, St. John (Sinjin) Reed
- Writing career
- Language: English
- Notable works: Deadly Medicine (1988), Amber House (2012), Neverwas (2014)

Kelly Moore is an American author and former attorney.

Her 1988 book Deadly Medicine, which focused on the crimes and trial of serial killer Genene Jones, was a New York Times bestseller for seven weeks. Amber House, the first installment in her young adult fiction series, co-written with her daughters Tucker Reed and Larkin Reed, was published by Scholastic's Arthur A. Levine Books imprint on October 1, 2012.

== Early life ==
Moore was born at the Lakehurst Naval Air Station in Manchester Township, New Jersey, site of the 1937 Hindenburg disaster, on August 30, 1956, the fourth child of Commander Lundi Addison Moore and his wife Delores "Lore" Moore (née Pike). The family relocated constantly throughout Moore's youth, finally settling in California. There Moore attended Live Oak High School in Morgan Hill, California, and then Santa Clara University in Santa Clara, California. According to interviews, Moore became fascinated by the nearby Winchester Mystery House during her time in the city; Sarah Winchester's infamous mansion would later influence Moore's first novel, Amber House.

== Career ==
Moore pursued a J.D. degree, graduating from UC Berkeley's Boalt Hall School of Law in 1982. She relocated to Los Angeles to practice civil and family law. At a holiday party in 1983, a mutual friend introduced Moore to actor Daniel Reed; the two would go on to co-write the New York Times bestseller Deadly Medicine, moving to Texas in 1984 to research and investigate the sixty infant deaths associated with pediatric nurse and convicted killer Genene Jones. The couple worked closely with one of the leading investigators of the case, who helped the writers to shed light on the administrative failings of San Antonio's Medical Center Hospital.

The couple's first child, Tucker Reed, was born in Los Gatos, California, in 1989, two days before the Loma Prieta earthquake that devastated the Bay Area. In 1991, a feature-length television adaptation of Deadly Medicine aired on NBC, starring Susan Ruttan and Veronica Hamel. At this time, Moore and Reed attempted to adapt Amber House into a television show. When the two failed to sell the project on their own, Reed suggested Moore approach his sister-in-law, Maureen Grady, in 1994. Moore collaborated for a time with Grady and Grady's friend actress Nancy Harewood, but the project was abandoned by 1997.

In August 1994, Moore began work at T. Patrick Freydl & Associates; among the clients represented by the firm was Guess model and Playboy Playmate of the Year Anna Nicole Smith. Together, both Moore and Smith parted company with Freydl in the spring of 1995, with Smith retaining Moore as her personal representative. Moore represented Smith on a number of cases (including Smith v. New Yorker Magazine, Harry Winston v. Smith, Cerrato v. Smith). For Anna Nicole Smith's battle with her stepson, E. Pierce Marshall over claims on her late husband's estate, Moore brought Marshall v. Marshall (the landmark case that would be argued before the Supreme Court in 2006) to the law firm of Kinsella, Boesch, Fujikawa and Towle. In 2011, Supreme Court of the United States ruled against the estate of Anna Nicole Smith, the Playboy Playmate whose marriage to the Texas oil tycoon J. Howard Marshall, 63 years her senior, led to an epic set of lawsuits between Smith and her stepson. The Justices overturned the bankruptcy court award to Smith's estate, that at one point exceeded $400 million. In August, 2014, Federal Judge David O. Carter, in Orange County, ruled Smith's estate would not receive $44 million from her stepson's estate, stating there was "just no evidence before the court that justifies awarding sanctions against Pierce Marshall's estate."

Moore had left the Smith case in 1998, divorced Reed in 2000, and retired from practicing law. Awarded primary custody of her three children (Larkin, born in 1993, and Sinjin, born in 1996), Moore moved to Oregon. In 2009, Moore's eldest, Tucker, began to research Moore's genealogy, which can be traced through Commander Moore to Stephen Hopkins, Jamestown colonist and signer of the Mayflower Compact. Tucker located a box in the family attic which held Moore and Reed's earliest notes on and drafts of the Amber House story. Believing the concept well-suited for young adult literature, Tucker persuaded her mother to collaborate on a novel; Moore's daughter Larkin was later included in the collaboration, as well. The ladies sold their novel (and two sequels) to the Arthur A. Levine imprint of Scholastic Press in 2011. Amber House was released to positive reviews on October 1, 2012. Its sequels, Neverwas and Otherwhen, were slated for 2014 and 2015, respectively.

On July 26, 2016, Moore was present and bore witness to the shooting death of her brother Shane Moore, as he was standing near the doorway of their mother's home waiting for a grant deed to be signed. Shane had previously been issued a court order directing him to keep away from Moore and her daughter, Tucker. The killing was committed by Tucker, who pled not guilty by reason of self-defense. Although Tucker finally accepted a plea deal during the explosion of the COVID epidemic after waiting nearly four years to bring her case to trial before a jury, Moore continues to maintain that Shane was lunging for the gun in Tucker's hand when it went off and that her daughter was innocent of any wrongdoing. However, video footage found on Ms. Reed's cellphone by law enforcement and shared on NBC's Dateline, shows that Shane Moore wasn't near the front door nor his sister at the time he was shot, nor was there a physical altercation taking place. She was recorded taunting her brother to “die” in the background of the dispatch audio after getting possession of the firearm, as well as prevented earlier aid after she delayed to properly secure it.

== Bibliography ==
- Deadly Medicine (1987, with Dan Reed)
- Amber House (2012, with Tucker and Larkin Reed)
- Neverwas (2014, with Tucker Reed and Larkin Reed)
