= Weena (disambiguation) =

Weena is a street in Rotterdam, the Netherlands

Weena may also refer to:

- Weena (Rotterdam), a street in Rotterdam, Netherlands
- Weena (The Time Machine), a character from the H.G. Wells novel The Time Machine and various adaptions of the novel
- Weena Mercator, a character from the animated series Freakazoid!
- Weena Morloch, a German electronic music band
