= Weena =

Fictional character

Weena is a fictional character in the novel The Time Machine, written by H. G. Wells in 1895. Introduced in the year 802,701 A.D., Weena is a member of the Eloi species, evolved from the human leisure class, and lives among other Eloi, who are preyed upon by the Morlocks, another species evolved from the human working class. She follows the unnamed Time Traveler on an expedition after he arrives in her time, and is eventually tragically lost in a fire.

Three films have been based upon the story, in 1960, 1978, and 2002, each portraying Weena differently.

== In the 1895 novel ==
In the original novel, the Time Traveler encounters Weena in the year 802,701 A.D. He rescues her from drowning in a "shallow", while the other Eloi do nothing to help. The next day, she presents him a garland of flowers, which she has made especially for him. He takes her on his expedition and decides to take her to his own time, the Victorian Era, but Weena faints and is lost in a fire when he battles the Morlocks to retrieve his time machine. He returns to his own time with two strange white flowers, which Weena had put into his pocket.

== In the 1960 film ==
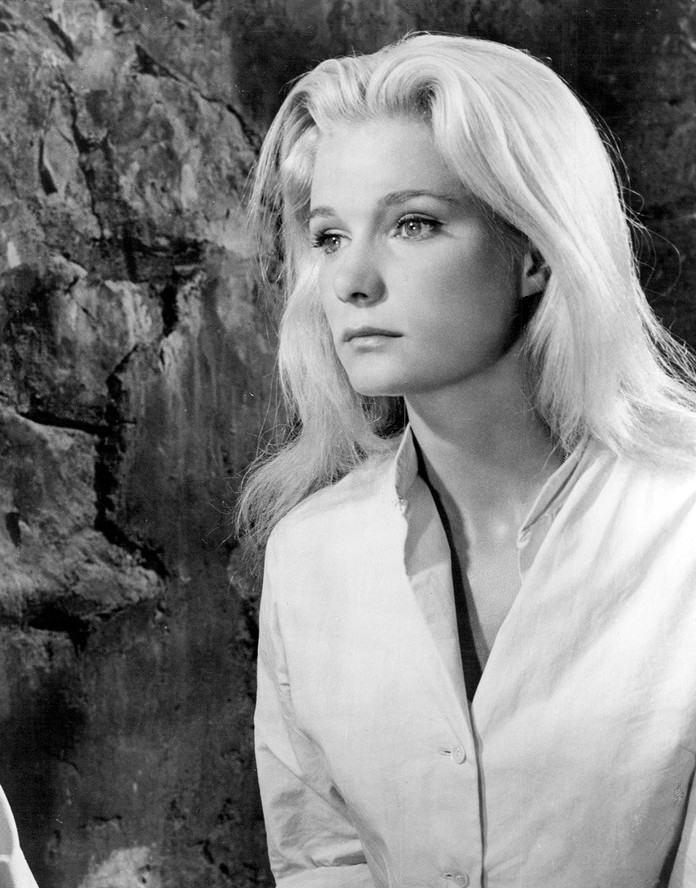
Weena portrayed by Yvette Mimieux

In 1960, George Pal directed the film The Time Machine, with screenplay by David Duncan, largely based on the novel; however some significant changes were made. The name "George" (after the author, Herbert George Wells) was given to the time traveler in the film. Traveling through different times, George reaches the year 802,701 A.D. where he finds a girl drowning in a "shallow", to which her race, the Eloi, are indifferent. He rescues her and learns her name, Weena. Unlike the novel, George does not leave Weena dead. He rescues Weena and the Eloi, returns to his own time, and then to Weena's time to be reunited with her. Weena was played by Yvette Mimieux.

== In the 1978 television film ==
Sunn Classic Pictures produced the television film The Time Machine in 1978. Some major changes were made to the story. The time traveler is Dr. Neil Perry, a scientist from the 1970s. The story takes place in the United States instead of the United Kingdom. He travels to the far future and befriends Weena, who tells him the Morlocks take the Eloi for an unknown purpose. Perry visits the Morlocks to rescue Weena's brother. He also teaches the Eloi how to defend themselves. He returns to his own time after completing his mission and again goes to the future to reunite with Weena. Priscilla Barnes played the role of Weena.

== In the 2002 film ==
Another movie with the same name was produced by Arnold Leibovit and directed by Simon Wells in 2002. Weena has been renamed Mara (played by Samantha Mumba). Dr. Alexander Hartdegen is an inventor in 1899 at Columbia University who devotes his life to making a time machine after the murder of his girlfriend Emma. He travels to the year 802,701 A.D., meets the Eloi, and is nursed back to health by Mara. He rescues Mara and starts a new life with her and the Eloi.

== In popular culture ==
- Asteroid 283142 Weena, discovered by German amateur astronomers Erwin Schwab and Rainer Kling in 2008, was named after the fictional character. The official naming citation was published by the Minor Planet Center on 17 December 2013 (M.P.C. 86284).
- The PBS children's series Wishbone, in which the title dog character recreates works of popular literature, had an episode entitled "Bark to the Future" in which Wishbone (voice of Larry Brantley) took on the role of the Time Traveler. Though abridged and toned down, the tale was told and the world of 802,701 A.D. was presented with pink-clad and pink-haired Eloi and monkey-like Morlocks. Weena was played by series regular Lisa-Gabrielle Greene.
