= Meanings of minor-planet names: 283001–284000 =

As minor planet discoveries are confirmed, they are given a permanent number by the IAU's Minor Planet Center (MPC), and the discoverers can then submit names for them, following the IAU's naming conventions. The list below concerns those minor planets in the specified number-range that have received names, and explains the meanings of those names.

Official naming citations of newly named small Solar System bodies are approved and published in a bulletin by IAU's Working Group for Small Bodies Nomenclature (WGSBN). Before May 2021, citations were published in MPC's Minor Planet Circulars for many decades. Recent citations can also be found on the JPL Small-Body Database (SBDB). Until his death in 2016, German astronomer Lutz D. Schmadel compiled these citations into the Dictionary of Minor Planet Names (DMP) and regularly updated the collection.

Based on Paul Herget's The Names of the Minor Planets, Schmadel also researched the unclear origin of numerous asteroids, most of which had been named prior to World War II. This article incorporates text from this source, which is in the public domain: SBDB New namings may only be added to this list below after official publication as the preannouncement of names is condemned. The WGSBN publishes a comprehensive guideline for the naming rules of non-cometary small Solar System bodies.

== 283001–283100 ==
| Named minor planet | Provisional | This minor planet was named for... | Ref · Catalog |
|---|---|---|---|
| 283057 Casteldipiazza | 2008 OZ_{5} | Castel di Piazza, a historic Italian village in northern Tuscany, near Florence, and home of co-discoverer Giancarlo Fagioli | JPL · 283057 |

== 283101–283200 ==
back to top

| Named minor planet | Provisional | This minor planet was named for... | Ref · Catalog |
|---|---|---|---|
| 283117 Bonn | 2008 VU | Bonn, German city which served as the capital of West Germany from 1949 to 1990. | IAU · 283117 |
| 283141 Dittsche | 2008 YW_{26} | Olli Dittrich (born 1956), known as "Dittsche", is a German actor, comedian and musician. | JPL · 283141 |
| 283142 Weena | 2008 YV_{29} | Weena, a fictional character in H. G. Wells sci-fi novel The Time Machine | JPL · 283142 |

== 283201–283300 ==
back to top

| Named minor planet | Provisional | This minor planet was named for... | Ref · Catalog |
|---|---|---|---|
| 283277 Faber | 2011 HX_{34} | Sandra Moore Faber (born 1944), an astronomer at University of California, Santa Cruz | JPL · 283277 |
| 283279 Qianweichang | 2011 HH_{38} | Qian Weichang (1912–2010), an academician of Chinese Academy of Sciences, was the founder of mechanics in China. He discovered the Qian Weichang equation and systematically developed the theory of large deflection of circular thin plates. | JPL · 283279 |

== 283301–283400 ==
back to top

| Named minor planet | Provisional | This minor planet was named for... | Ref · Catalog |
|---|---|---|---|
There are no named minor planets in this number range

== 283401–283500 ==
back to top

| Named minor planet | Provisional | This minor planet was named for... | Ref · Catalog |
|---|---|---|---|
| 283455 Philipkrider | 2001 FV_{221} | E. Philip Krider (born 1940) made fundamental contributions to understanding physical processes producing atmospheric electrical discharges while at the University of Arizona. He chaired a panel providing recommendations to prevent lightning strikes such as those hitting the Apollo 12 launch. He is also an expert on the life and science of Benjamin Franklin. | JPL · 283455 |
| 283461 Leacipaola | 2001 PX_{28} | Paola Leaci (born 1980), a researcher at the Physics Department of the Sapienza University of Rome | JPL · 283461 |

== 283501–283600 ==
back to top

| Named minor planet | Provisional | This minor planet was named for... | Ref · Catalog |
|---|---|---|---|
There are no named minor planets in this number range

== 283601–283700 ==
back to top

| Named minor planet | Provisional | This minor planet was named for... | Ref · Catalog |
|---|---|---|---|
There are no named minor planets in this number range

== 283701–283800 ==
back to top

| Named minor planet | Provisional | This minor planet was named for... | Ref · Catalog |
|---|---|---|---|
| 283786 Rutebeuf | 2003 QF_{104} | Rutebeuf (1245–1285), a French poet | JPL · 283786 |

== 283801–283900 ==
back to top

| Named minor planet | Provisional | This minor planet was named for... | Ref · Catalog |
|---|---|---|---|
There are no named minor planets in this number range

== 283901–284000 ==
back to top

| Named minor planet | Provisional | This minor planet was named for... | Ref · Catalog |
|---|---|---|---|
| 283990 Randallrosenfeld | 2004 SG_{2} | Randall Rosenfeld (born 1959), the national archivist of the Royal Astronomical Society of Canada | JPL · 283990 |

back to top

| Preceded by 282,001–283,000 | Meanings of minor-planet names List of minor planets: 283,001–284,000 | Succeeded by 284,001–285,000 |
