= List of minor planets: 283001–284000 =

The following is a partial list of minor planets, running from minor-planet number 283001 through 284000, inclusive. The primary data for this and other partial lists is based on JPL's "Small-Body Orbital Elements" and data available from the Minor Planet Center. Critical list information is also provided by the MPC, unless otherwise specified from Lowell Observatory. A detailed description of the table's columns and additional sources are given on the main page including a complete list of every page in this series, and a statistical break-up on the dynamical classification of minor planets.

Also see the summary list of all named bodies in numerical and alphabetical order, and the corresponding naming citations for the number range of this particular list. New namings may only be added to this list after official publication, as the preannouncement of names is condemned by the Working Group for Small Bodies Nomenclature of the International Astronomical Union.

Near-Earth obj.	MBA (inner)	MBA (outer)	Centaur
Mars-crosser	MBA (middle)	Jupiter trojan	Trans-Neptunian obj.
Unclassified

== 283001–283100 ==
Designation			Discovery			Properties		Ref
Permanent	Provisional	Named after	Date	Site	Discoverer(s)	Category	Diam.	Ref
283001	2007 TF_{386}	—	October 15, 2007	Catalina	CSS	·	2.3 km	MPC · JPL
283002	2007 TH_{387}	—	October 13, 2007	Kitt Peak	Spacewatch	·	3.9 km	MPC · JPL
283003	2007 TS_{390}	—	October 14, 2007	Mount Lemmon	Mount Lemmon Survey	·	2.0 km	MPC · JPL
283004	2007 TQ_{393}	—	October 14, 2007	Catalina	CSS	·	4.9 km	MPC · JPL
283005	2007 TZ_{411}	—	October 14, 2007	Catalina	CSS	·	2.8 km	MPC · JPL
283006	2007 TU_{418}	—	October 8, 2007	Anderson Mesa	LONEOS	·	2.6 km	MPC · JPL
283007	2007 UF	—	October 16, 2007	Bisei SG Center	BATTeRS	·	700 m	MPC · JPL
283008	2007 UR_{46}	—	October 20, 2007	Catalina	CSS	·	2.1 km	MPC · JPL
283009	2007 UT_{50}	—	October 24, 2007	Mount Lemmon	Mount Lemmon Survey	·	1.8 km	MPC · JPL
283010	2007 UG_{83}	—	October 30, 2007	Kitt Peak	Spacewatch	·	1.9 km	MPC · JPL
283011	2007 UH_{116}	—	October 31, 2007	Kitt Peak	Spacewatch	EOS	2.8 km	MPC · JPL
283012	2007 VQ_{38}	—	November 2, 2007	Catalina	CSS	·	5.9 km	MPC · JPL
283013	2007 VA_{50}	—	November 1, 2007	Kitt Peak	Spacewatch	·	3.7 km	MPC · JPL
283014	2007 VC_{94}	—	November 7, 2007	Socorro	LINEAR	·	1.7 km	MPC · JPL
283015	2007 VT_{98}	—	November 2, 2007	Kitt Peak	Spacewatch	·	570 m	MPC · JPL
283016	2007 VF_{124}	—	November 5, 2007	Mount Lemmon	Mount Lemmon Survey	·	2.9 km	MPC · JPL
283017	2007 VW_{126}	—	November 11, 2007	Bisei SG Center	BATTeRS	EOS	2.9 km	MPC · JPL
283018	2007 VA_{156}	—	November 5, 2007	Kitt Peak	Spacewatch	·	2.2 km	MPC · JPL
283019	2007 VD_{182}	—	November 8, 2007	Catalina	CSS	EUN	1.7 km	MPC · JPL
283020	2007 VU_{193}	—	November 4, 2007	Mount Lemmon	Mount Lemmon Survey	·	870 m	MPC · JPL
283021	2007 VN_{208}	—	November 11, 2007	Catalina	CSS	·	3.4 km	MPC · JPL
283022	2007 VA_{234}	—	November 8, 2007	Purple Mountain	PMO NEO Survey Program	EUP	4.4 km	MPC · JPL
283023	2007 VJ_{253}	—	November 13, 2007	Catalina	CSS	·	5.5 km	MPC · JPL
283024	2007 VV_{267}	—	November 9, 2007	Socorro	LINEAR	·	2.6 km	MPC · JPL
283025	2007 VN_{269}	—	November 14, 2007	Socorro	LINEAR	·	3.7 km	MPC · JPL
283026	2007 VH_{284}	—	November 14, 2007	Kitt Peak	Spacewatch	·	6.2 km	MPC · JPL
283027	2007 VQ_{321}	—	November 3, 2007	Catalina	CSS	·	3.8 km	MPC · JPL
283028	2007 VY_{321}	—	November 8, 2007	Mount Lemmon	Mount Lemmon Survey	·	750 m	MPC · JPL
283029	2007 WH_{5}	—	November 18, 2007	Bisei SG Center	BATTeRS	EOS	2.2 km	MPC · JPL
283030	2007 WG_{8}	—	November 18, 2007	Socorro	LINEAR	EOS	2.6 km	MPC · JPL
283031	2007 WV_{15}	—	November 18, 2007	Mount Lemmon	Mount Lemmon Survey	·	2.7 km	MPC · JPL
283032	2007 WD_{19}	—	November 18, 2007	Mount Lemmon	Mount Lemmon Survey	·	3.9 km	MPC · JPL
283033	2007 WH_{40}	—	November 18, 2007	Catalina	CSS	·	3.9 km	MPC · JPL
283034	2007 XG_{15}	—	December 7, 2007	Pla D'Arguines	R. Ferrando	·	4.6 km	MPC · JPL
283035	2007 XJ_{46}	—	December 15, 2007	Catalina	CSS	·	3.8 km	MPC · JPL
283036	2007 YE_{52}	—	December 30, 2007	Anderson Mesa	LONEOS	·	3.1 km	MPC · JPL
283037	2008 BG_{8}	—	January 16, 2008	Kitt Peak	Spacewatch	·	3.4 km	MPC · JPL
283038	2008 BS_{14}	—	January 28, 2008	Altschwendt	W. Ries	EOS	2.4 km	MPC · JPL
283039	2008 BV_{29}	—	January 30, 2008	Catalina	CSS	(2076)	930 m	MPC · JPL
283040	2008 BJ_{30}	—	January 30, 2008	Mount Lemmon	Mount Lemmon Survey	·	2.2 km	MPC · JPL
283041	2008 CC	—	February 2, 2008	Catalina	CSS	H	760 m	MPC · JPL
283042	2008 CC_{73}	—	February 11, 2008	Catalina	CSS	H	920 m	MPC · JPL
283043	2008 DD_{15}	—	February 26, 2008	Mount Lemmon	Mount Lemmon Survey	·	910 m	MPC · JPL
283044	2008 DH_{67}	—	February 29, 2008	Kitt Peak	Spacewatch	·	2.4 km	MPC · JPL
283045	2008 EW_{16}	—	March 1, 2008	Kitt Peak	Spacewatch	·	920 m	MPC · JPL
283046	2008 EB_{36}	—	March 3, 2008	Catalina	CSS	·	3.2 km	MPC · JPL
283047	2008 EU_{84}	—	March 13, 2008	Catalina	CSS	H	820 m	MPC · JPL
283048	2008 EA_{143}	—	March 13, 2008	Catalina	CSS	·	1.1 km	MPC · JPL
283049	2008 EQ_{148}	—	March 2, 2008	Kitt Peak	Spacewatch	·	1.3 km	MPC · JPL
283050	2008 FX_{22}	—	March 27, 2008	Kitt Peak	Spacewatch	·	3.7 km	MPC · JPL
283051	2008 FZ_{123}	—	March 29, 2008	Kitt Peak	Spacewatch	·	5.8 km	MPC · JPL
283052	2008 GA_{38}	—	April 3, 2008	Kitt Peak	Spacewatch	EOS	2.7 km	MPC · JPL
283053	2008 GJ_{120}	—	April 12, 2008	Catalina	CSS	·	1.3 km	MPC · JPL
283054	2008 HN_{19}	—	April 26, 2008	Kitt Peak	Spacewatch	·	2.6 km	MPC · JPL
283055	2008 HS_{29}	—	April 28, 2008	Mount Lemmon	Mount Lemmon Survey	·	3.0 km	MPC · JPL
283056	2008 OH	—	July 25, 2008	La Sagra	OAM	·	1.8 km	MPC · JPL
283057 Casteldipiazza	2008 OZ_{5}	Casteldipiazza	July 24, 2008	San Marcello	Fagioli, G., L. Tesi	·	1.0 km	MPC · JPL
283058	2008 ON_{23}	—	July 30, 2008	Mount Lemmon	Mount Lemmon Survey	HNS	1.5 km	MPC · JPL
283059	2008 PM_{22}	—	August 7, 2008	Kitt Peak	Spacewatch	·	1.2 km	MPC · JPL
283060	2008 QF_{3}	—	August 25, 2008	Pla D'Arguines	R. Ferrando	·	910 m	MPC · JPL
283061	2008 QZ_{5}	—	August 25, 2008	Reedy Creek	J. Broughton	·	910 m	MPC · JPL
283062	2008 QB_{13}	—	August 27, 2008	La Sagra	OAM	·	1.4 km	MPC · JPL
283063	2008 QH_{13}	—	August 27, 2008	La Sagra	OAM	·	660 m	MPC · JPL
283064	2008 QE_{29}	—	August 30, 2008	Socorro	LINEAR	·	1.1 km	MPC · JPL
283065	2008 RQ_{36}	—	September 2, 2008	Kitt Peak	Spacewatch	·	620 m	MPC · JPL
283066	2008 RC_{41}	—	September 2, 2008	Kitt Peak	Spacewatch	·	2.3 km	MPC · JPL
283067	2008 RL_{45}	—	September 2, 2008	Kitt Peak	Spacewatch	·	580 m	MPC · JPL
283068	2008 RB_{98}	—	September 7, 2008	Mount Lemmon	Mount Lemmon Survey	·	3.1 km	MPC · JPL
283069	2008 RK_{112}	—	September 4, 2008	Kitt Peak	Spacewatch	CLA	1.8 km	MPC · JPL
283070	2008 RE_{132}	—	September 6, 2008	Catalina	CSS	·	1.8 km	MPC · JPL
283071	2008 RS_{145}	—	September 6, 2008	Kitt Peak	Spacewatch	·	1.4 km	MPC · JPL
283072	2008 SZ_{2}	—	September 19, 2008	Socorro	LINEAR	·	1.0 km	MPC · JPL
283073	2008 SP_{81}	—	September 21, 2008	Vicques	M. Ory	·	910 m	MPC · JPL
283074	2008 SK_{92}	—	September 21, 2008	Kitt Peak	Spacewatch	·	1.8 km	MPC · JPL
283075	2008 SK_{145}	—	September 20, 2008	Kitt Peak	Spacewatch	VER	3.7 km	MPC · JPL
283076	2008 SW_{155}	—	September 23, 2008	Socorro	LINEAR	·	1.2 km	MPC · JPL
283077	2008 SW_{175}	—	September 23, 2008	Catalina	CSS	·	780 m	MPC · JPL
283078	2008 ST_{176}	—	September 23, 2008	Mount Lemmon	Mount Lemmon Survey	(2076)	910 m	MPC · JPL
283079	2008 SS_{242}	—	September 29, 2008	Kitt Peak	Spacewatch	·	1.8 km	MPC · JPL
283080	2008 SS_{244}	—	September 29, 2008	Catalina	CSS	V	680 m	MPC · JPL
283081	2008 SZ_{269}	—	September 23, 2008	Catalina	CSS	·	860 m	MPC · JPL
283082	2008 ST_{271}	—	September 30, 2008	Mount Lemmon	Mount Lemmon Survey	·	4.3 km	MPC · JPL
283083	2008 SA_{281}	—	September 24, 2008	Mount Lemmon	Mount Lemmon Survey	WIT	1.1 km	MPC · JPL
283084	2008 TD_{9}	—	October 7, 2008	Calvin-Rehoboth	L. A. Molnar	·	730 m	MPC · JPL
283085	2008 TZ_{18}	—	October 1, 2008	Mount Lemmon	Mount Lemmon Survey	MAS	920 m	MPC · JPL
283086	2008 TB_{21}	—	October 1, 2008	Mount Lemmon	Mount Lemmon Survey	·	1.8 km	MPC · JPL
283087	2008 TT_{89}	—	October 3, 2008	Kitt Peak	Spacewatch	·	1.2 km	MPC · JPL
283088	2008 TX_{94}	—	October 5, 2008	La Sagra	OAM	·	1.1 km	MPC · JPL
283089	2008 TN_{117}	—	October 6, 2008	Kitt Peak	Spacewatch	·	3.0 km	MPC · JPL
283090	2008 TK_{166}	—	October 7, 2008	Mount Lemmon	Mount Lemmon Survey	·	1.3 km	MPC · JPL
283091	2008 TK_{171}	—	October 1, 2008	Kitt Peak	Spacewatch	·	2.3 km	MPC · JPL
283092	2008 UK_{51}	—	October 20, 2008	Kitt Peak	Spacewatch	·	2.0 km	MPC · JPL
283093	2008 US_{80}	—	October 22, 2008	Kitt Peak	Spacewatch	·	3.5 km	MPC · JPL
283094	2008 UX_{81}	—	October 22, 2008	Mount Lemmon	Mount Lemmon Survey	KOR	1.5 km	MPC · JPL
283095	2008 UK_{100}	—	October 27, 2008	Bisei SG Center	BATTeRS	·	2.7 km	MPC · JPL
283096	2008 UB_{128}	—	October 22, 2008	Kitt Peak	Spacewatch	(5)	1.6 km	MPC · JPL
283097	2008 UZ_{130}	—	October 23, 2008	Kitt Peak	Spacewatch	·	1.6 km	MPC · JPL
283098	2008 UR_{138}	—	October 23, 2008	Kitt Peak	Spacewatch	·	1.9 km	MPC · JPL
283099	2008 UE_{145}	—	October 23, 2008	Kitt Peak	Spacewatch	PHO	960 m	MPC · JPL
283100	2008 UX_{159}	—	October 23, 2008	Kitt Peak	Spacewatch	·	4.0 km	MPC · JPL

== 283101–283200 ==
back to top

Designation			Discovery			Properties		Ref
Permanent	Provisional	Named after	Date	Site	Discoverer(s)	Category	Diam.	Ref
283101	2008 UV_{173}	—	October 24, 2008	Catalina	CSS	·	1.1 km	MPC · JPL
283102	2008 UY_{176}	—	October 24, 2008	Mount Lemmon	Mount Lemmon Survey	·	2.8 km	MPC · JPL
283103	2008 UB_{188}	—	October 24, 2008	Kitt Peak	Spacewatch	MRX	1.3 km	MPC · JPL
283104	2008 UX_{188}	—	October 25, 2008	Kitt Peak	Spacewatch	·	660 m	MPC · JPL
283105	2008 UD_{210}	—	October 23, 2008	Kitt Peak	Spacewatch	·	1.6 km	MPC · JPL
283106	2008 UJ_{243}	—	October 26, 2008	Kitt Peak	Spacewatch	(194)	2.7 km	MPC · JPL
283107	2008 UX_{261}	—	October 27, 2008	Mount Lemmon	Mount Lemmon Survey	·	1.6 km	MPC · JPL
283108	2008 UR_{271}	—	October 28, 2008	Kitt Peak	Spacewatch	V	1.2 km	MPC · JPL
283109	2008 UK_{280}	—	October 28, 2008	Catalina	CSS	EUN	1.5 km	MPC · JPL
283110	2008 UD_{290}	—	October 28, 2008	Kitt Peak	Spacewatch	EOS	2.4 km	MPC · JPL
283111	2008 UU_{298}	—	October 29, 2008	Kitt Peak	Spacewatch	EUN	1.8 km	MPC · JPL
283112	2008 US_{304}	—	October 29, 2008	Mount Lemmon	Mount Lemmon Survey	·	1.6 km	MPC · JPL
283113	2008 UE_{336}	—	October 20, 2008	Kitt Peak	Spacewatch	PHO	1.5 km	MPC · JPL
283114	2008 UD_{342}	—	October 28, 2008	Mount Lemmon	Mount Lemmon Survey	·	1.3 km	MPC · JPL
283115	2008 UD_{354}	—	October 23, 2008	Mount Lemmon	Mount Lemmon Survey	KOR	1.5 km	MPC · JPL
283116	2008 UX_{360}	—	October 30, 2008	Catalina	CSS	·	3.0 km	MPC · JPL
283117 Bonn	2008 VU	Bonn	November 1, 2008	Tzec Maun	E. Schwab	·	4.5 km	MPC · JPL
283118	2008 VX	—	November 1, 2008	Needville	J. Dellinger, Sexton, C.	(5)	1.5 km	MPC · JPL
283119	2008 VB_{18}	—	November 1, 2008	Kitt Peak	Spacewatch	·	2.0 km	MPC · JPL
283120	2008 VX_{20}	—	November 1, 2008	Mount Lemmon	Mount Lemmon Survey	KOR	2.1 km	MPC · JPL
283121	2008 VA_{50}	—	November 4, 2008	Kitt Peak	Spacewatch	·	1.7 km	MPC · JPL
283122	2008 VQ_{53}	—	November 6, 2008	Catalina	CSS	·	2.8 km	MPC · JPL
283123	2008 VD_{57}	—	November 6, 2008	Mount Lemmon	Mount Lemmon Survey	·	2.0 km	MPC · JPL
283124	2008 VS_{59}	—	November 7, 2008	Catalina	CSS	·	1.8 km	MPC · JPL
283125	2008 WF_{37}	—	November 17, 2008	Kitt Peak	Spacewatch	·	2.1 km	MPC · JPL
283126	2008 WK_{38}	—	November 17, 2008	Kitt Peak	Spacewatch	KOR	1.6 km	MPC · JPL
283127	2008 WE_{43}	—	November 17, 2008	Kitt Peak	Spacewatch	·	1.7 km	MPC · JPL
283128	2008 WO_{67}	—	November 18, 2008	Kitt Peak	Spacewatch	·	2.5 km	MPC · JPL
283129	2008 WR_{76}	—	November 20, 2008	Kitt Peak	Spacewatch	·	2.1 km	MPC · JPL
283130	2008 WC_{85}	—	November 20, 2008	Mount Lemmon	Mount Lemmon Survey	·	5.3 km	MPC · JPL
283131	2008 WM_{90}	—	November 22, 2008	Mount Lemmon	Mount Lemmon Survey	·	3.4 km	MPC · JPL
283132	2008 WS_{96}	—	November 25, 2008	Calvin-Rehoboth	L. A. Molnar	·	1.8 km	MPC · JPL
283133	2008 XH_{39}	—	December 2, 2008	Kitt Peak	Spacewatch	·	2.1 km	MPC · JPL
283134	2008 XO_{48}	—	December 4, 2008	Mount Lemmon	Mount Lemmon Survey	EOS	2.3 km	MPC · JPL
283135	2008 XL_{50}	—	December 4, 2008	Mount Lemmon	Mount Lemmon Survey	CYB	6.2 km	MPC · JPL
283136	2008 XV_{52}	—	December 3, 2008	Catalina	CSS	HNS	1.8 km	MPC · JPL
283137	2008 XM_{55}	—	December 1, 2008	Kitt Peak	Spacewatch	·	5.0 km	MPC · JPL
283138	2008 YJ_{4}	—	December 22, 2008	Dauban	Kugel, F.	(5)	2.0 km	MPC · JPL
283139	2008 YQ_{11}	—	December 21, 2008	Kitt Peak	Spacewatch	·	2.8 km	MPC · JPL
283140	2008 YX_{24}	—	December 28, 2008	Mayhill	Lowe, A.	·	2.3 km	MPC · JPL
283141 Dittsche	2008 YW_{26}	Dittsche	December 28, 2008	Wildberg	R. Apitzsch	(194)	2.7 km	MPC · JPL
283142 Weena	2008 YV_{29}	Weena	December 29, 2008	Taunus	E. Schwab, R. Kling	HNS	1.7 km	MPC · JPL
283143	2008 YO_{34}	—	December 31, 2008	Bergisch Gladbach	W. Bickel	·	5.1 km	MPC · JPL
283144	2008 YJ_{50}	—	December 29, 2008	Mount Lemmon	Mount Lemmon Survey	·	3.6 km	MPC · JPL
283145	2008 YX_{73}	—	December 30, 2008	Kitt Peak	Spacewatch	(12739)	2.0 km	MPC · JPL
283146	2008 YW_{121}	—	December 30, 2008	Kitt Peak	Spacewatch	·	2.3 km	MPC · JPL
283147	2008 YS_{124}	—	December 30, 2008	Kitt Peak	Spacewatch	·	2.5 km	MPC · JPL
283148	2008 YF_{134}	—	December 30, 2008	Kitt Peak	Spacewatch	·	1.0 km	MPC · JPL
283149	2008 YX_{139}	—	December 30, 2008	Kitt Peak	Spacewatch	EOS	2.6 km	MPC · JPL
283150	2008 YT_{149}	—	December 21, 2008	Kitt Peak	Spacewatch	·	5.8 km	MPC · JPL
283151	2009 AD_{8}	—	January 1, 2009	Purple Mountain	PMO NEO Survey Program	·	3.2 km	MPC · JPL
283152	2009 AH_{31}	—	January 15, 2009	Kitt Peak	Spacewatch	·	3.1 km	MPC · JPL
283153	2009 AZ_{43}	—	January 3, 2009	Mount Lemmon	Mount Lemmon Survey	·	1.6 km	MPC · JPL
283154	2009 AD_{47}	—	January 1, 2009	Kitt Peak	Spacewatch	·	2.6 km	MPC · JPL
283155	2009 BC_{14}	—	January 26, 2009	Socorro	LINEAR	·	2.1 km	MPC · JPL
283156	2009 BR_{55}	—	January 17, 2009	Kitt Peak	Spacewatch	·	1.6 km	MPC · JPL
283157	2009 BL_{60}	—	January 17, 2009	La Sagra	OAM	BRA	2.0 km	MPC · JPL
283158	2009 BZ_{65}	—	January 20, 2009	Kitt Peak	Spacewatch	AGN	1.5 km	MPC · JPL
283159	2009 BW_{99}	—	January 28, 2009	Catalina	CSS	·	3.4 km	MPC · JPL
283160	2009 BC_{151}	—	January 29, 2009	Catalina	CSS	EUP	4.3 km	MPC · JPL
283161	2009 BX_{162}	—	January 31, 2009	Kitt Peak	Spacewatch	·	3.0 km	MPC · JPL
283162	2009 BV_{172}	—	January 18, 2009	Kitt Peak	Spacewatch	·	3.8 km	MPC · JPL
283163	2009 BL_{190}	—	January 20, 2009	Mount Lemmon	Mount Lemmon Survey	3:2	7.7 km	MPC · JPL
283164	2009 CR_{24}	—	February 1, 2009	Kitt Peak	Spacewatch	T_{j} (2.99)	3.8 km	MPC · JPL
283165	2009 CP_{64}	—	February 3, 2009	Kitt Peak	Spacewatch	CYB	4.6 km	MPC · JPL
283166	2009 DZ_{15}	—	February 16, 2009	La Sagra	OAM	ELF	5.0 km	MPC · JPL
283167	2009 DN_{26}	—	February 22, 2009	Calar Alto	F. Hormuth	EUN	1.5 km	MPC · JPL
283168	2009 DT_{117}	—	February 27, 2009	Kitt Peak	Spacewatch	THB	5.6 km	MPC · JPL
283169	2009 DC_{140}	—	February 19, 2009	Socorro	LINEAR	H	590 m	MPC · JPL
283170	2009 ER_{4}	—	March 15, 2009	La Sagra	OAM	·	2.4 km	MPC · JPL
283171	2009 FR_{5}	—	March 16, 2009	Kitt Peak	Spacewatch	AGN · fast	1.8 km	MPC · JPL
283172	2009 FV_{26}	—	March 18, 2009	Kitt Peak	Spacewatch	·	820 m	MPC · JPL
283173	2009 HZ_{62}	—	April 22, 2009	Kitt Peak	Spacewatch	L5	13 km	MPC · JPL
283174	2009 HD_{81}	—	April 29, 2009	Kitt Peak	Spacewatch	·	2.4 km	MPC · JPL
283175	2009 JU_{10}	—	May 14, 2009	Kitt Peak	Spacewatch	·	2.5 km	MPC · JPL
283176	2009 QF_{59}	—	August 29, 2009	La Sagra	OAM	L4	10 km	MPC · JPL
283177	2009 RR_{52}	—	March 15, 2007	Kitt Peak	Spacewatch	·	1.4 km	MPC · JPL
283178	2009 SF_{1}	—	September 17, 2009	Mount Lemmon	Mount Lemmon Survey	L5	9.9 km	MPC · JPL
283179	2009 SS_{35}	—	September 16, 2009	Kitt Peak	Spacewatch	·	2.8 km	MPC · JPL
283180	2009 SC_{160}	—	September 20, 2009	Kitt Peak	Spacewatch	·	2.5 km	MPC · JPL
283181	2009 US	—	October 17, 2009	Socorro	LINEAR	H	1.0 km	MPC · JPL
283182	2009 UJ_{28}	—	October 22, 2009	Catalina	CSS	·	2.2 km	MPC · JPL
283183	2009 UG_{106}	—	October 21, 2009	Mount Lemmon	Mount Lemmon Survey	·	2.2 km	MPC · JPL
283184	2009 WA_{33}	—	October 10, 2002	Apache Point	SDSS	·	840 m	MPC · JPL
283185	2010 AR_{30}	—	January 5, 2010	Kitt Peak	Spacewatch	·	1.6 km	MPC · JPL
283186	2010 BG_{3}	—	January 19, 2010	Dauban	Kugel, F.	NYS	1.3 km	MPC · JPL
283187	2010 BB_{13}	—	January 16, 2010	WISE	WISE	CYB	7.0 km	MPC · JPL
283188	2010 BV_{15}	—	January 16, 2010	WISE	WISE	EUP	7.6 km	MPC · JPL
283189	2010 CG_{4}	—	February 6, 2010	Mount Lemmon	Mount Lemmon Survey	·	1.8 km	MPC · JPL
283190	2010 CO_{5}	—	February 9, 2010	Mount Lemmon	Mount Lemmon Survey	·	1.2 km	MPC · JPL
283191	2010 CQ_{39}	—	February 13, 2010	Mount Lemmon	Mount Lemmon Survey	·	920 m	MPC · JPL
283192	2010 CE_{44}	—	February 13, 2010	Calvin-Rehoboth	Calvin College	HNS	1.4 km	MPC · JPL
283193	2010 CM_{88}	—	February 14, 2010	Mount Lemmon	Mount Lemmon Survey	·	1.6 km	MPC · JPL
283194	2010 CS_{91}	—	February 14, 2010	Mount Lemmon	Mount Lemmon Survey	·	3.0 km	MPC · JPL
283195	2010 CS_{120}	—	February 15, 2010	Catalina	CSS	HOF	2.9 km	MPC · JPL
283196	2010 CC_{150}	—	February 14, 2010	Catalina	CSS	·	3.9 km	MPC · JPL
283197	2010 CT_{170}	—	February 13, 2010	Kitt Peak	Spacewatch	·	2.3 km	MPC · JPL
283198	2010 CK_{184}	—	February 10, 2010	Kitt Peak	Spacewatch	·	2.4 km	MPC · JPL
283199	2010 DP_{13}	—	February 16, 2010	WISE	WISE	·	5.9 km	MPC · JPL
283200	2010 DH_{37}	—	February 16, 2010	Kitt Peak	Spacewatch	MIS	2.2 km	MPC · JPL

== 283201–283300 ==
back to top

Designation			Discovery			Properties		Ref
Permanent	Provisional	Named after	Date	Site	Discoverer(s)	Category	Diam.	Ref
283201	2010 DG_{55}	—	February 21, 2010	WISE	WISE	·	4.6 km	MPC · JPL
283202	2010 EA_{43}	—	March 13, 2010	Vail-Jarnac	Jarnac	·	5.9 km	MPC · JPL
283203	2010 FV_{13}	—	March 17, 2010	Kitt Peak	Spacewatch	·	4.6 km	MPC · JPL
283204	2010 FE_{20}	—	April 25, 2003	Kitt Peak	Spacewatch	3:2	5.3 km	MPC · JPL
283205	2010 FV_{48}	—	August 17, 2002	Palomar	NEAT	·	2.3 km	MPC · JPL
283206	2010 GK_{139}	—	April 7, 2010	Kitt Peak	Spacewatch	VER	4.4 km	MPC · JPL
283207	2010 HH_{79}	—	April 17, 2010	Bergisch Gladbach	W. Bickel	·	3.6 km	MPC · JPL
283208	2010 HG_{105}	—	November 19, 2003	Kitt Peak	Spacewatch	·	2.2 km	MPC · JPL
283209	2010 LE_{92}	—	June 12, 2010	WISE	WISE	·	4.8 km	MPC · JPL
283210	2010 MG_{46}	—	February 27, 2000	Catalina	CSS	·	4.1 km	MPC · JPL
283211	2010 MH_{69}	—	October 19, 2006	Catalina	CSS	·	2.2 km	MPC · JPL
283212	2010 NM_{24}	—	November 5, 2007	Kitt Peak	Spacewatch	ERI	2.5 km	MPC · JPL
283213	2010 NY_{55}	—	July 10, 2010	WISE	WISE	·	2.4 km	MPC · JPL
283214	2010 OL_{23}	—	June 29, 2005	Palomar	NEAT	·	2.0 km	MPC · JPL
283215	2010 OQ_{46}	—	July 22, 2010	WISE	WISE	EUP	4.0 km	MPC · JPL
283216	2010 OO_{63}	—	October 4, 1999	Catalina	CSS	·	4.4 km	MPC · JPL
283217	2010 OV_{70}	—	July 25, 2010	WISE	WISE	·	3.8 km	MPC · JPL
283218	2010 OQ_{95}	—	January 4, 2003	Kitt Peak	Spacewatch	·	1.5 km	MPC · JPL
283219	2010 OW_{123}	—	October 10, 1999	Kitt Peak	Spacewatch	EUP	4.7 km	MPC · JPL
283220	2010 PG_{10}	—	August 5, 2010	Socorro	LINEAR	·	3.0 km	MPC · JPL
283221	2010 PR_{26}	—	August 3, 2010	La Sagra	OAM	·	1.5 km	MPC · JPL
283222	2010 PM_{41}	—	December 24, 2005	Socorro	LINEAR	·	4.0 km	MPC · JPL
283223	2010 PS_{79}	—	August 13, 2010	Kitt Peak	Spacewatch	EOS	2.6 km	MPC · JPL
283224	2010 QO_{1}	—	December 18, 2007	Mount Lemmon	Mount Lemmon Survey	·	2.8 km	MPC · JPL
283225	2010 QX_{2}	—	August 19, 2010	Purple Mountain	PMO NEO Survey Program	·	1.6 km	MPC · JPL
283226	2010 RA_{51}	—	December 19, 2001	Palomar	NEAT	·	1.8 km	MPC · JPL
283227	2010 RW_{60}	—	September 17, 2003	Kitt Peak	Spacewatch	·	960 m	MPC · JPL
283228	2010 RD_{65}	—	September 3, 2010	Mount Lemmon	Mount Lemmon Survey	·	2.5 km	MPC · JPL
283229	2010 RS_{74}	—	October 31, 2002	Apache Point	SDSS	·	2.2 km	MPC · JPL
283230	2010 RL_{118}	—	September 11, 2010	Kitt Peak	Spacewatch	·	4.1 km	MPC · JPL
283231	2010 RX_{169}	—	September 19, 2006	Kitt Peak	Spacewatch	·	1.5 km	MPC · JPL
283232	2010 RY_{171}	—	September 4, 2010	Kitt Peak	Spacewatch	·	1.5 km	MPC · JPL
283233	2010 SB_{14}	—	October 26, 2005	Kitt Peak	Spacewatch	·	3.9 km	MPC · JPL
283234	2010 TG_{34}	—	April 6, 1995	Kitt Peak	Spacewatch	·	840 m	MPC · JPL
283235	2010 TX_{147}	—	March 5, 2008	Kitt Peak	Spacewatch	slow	1.9 km	MPC · JPL
283236	2010 TT_{162}	—	October 13, 2010	Catalina	CSS	L4	10 km	MPC · JPL
283237	2010 UY_{2}	—	August 14, 2001	Haleakala	NEAT	·	1.8 km	MPC · JPL
283238	2010 UL_{16}	—	September 8, 1999	Catalina	CSS	·	1.3 km	MPC · JPL
283239	2010 UC_{65}	—	November 24, 2006	Kitt Peak	Spacewatch	·	1.7 km	MPC · JPL
283240	2010 VJ_{45}	—	November 11, 2006	Kitt Peak	Spacewatch	·	1.4 km	MPC · JPL
283241	2010 VA_{74}	—	November 10, 2006	Kitt Peak	Spacewatch	·	1.9 km	MPC · JPL
283242	2011 AS_{30}	—	February 2, 2008	Kitt Peak	Spacewatch	·	780 m	MPC · JPL
283243	2011 DR_{3}	—	January 17, 2005	Kitt Peak	Spacewatch	·	4.0 km	MPC · JPL
283244	2011 DO_{8}	—	December 30, 2005	Catalina	CSS	·	2.8 km	MPC · JPL
283245	2011 DM_{11}	—	April 4, 2002	Haleakala	NEAT	·	2.6 km	MPC · JPL
283246	2011 DK_{16}	—	September 14, 1998	Kitt Peak	Spacewatch	·	3.3 km	MPC · JPL
283247	2011 EU_{17}	—	December 1, 2005	Catalina	CSS	·	2.4 km	MPC · JPL
283248	2011 EY_{19}	—	November 19, 2003	Kitt Peak	Spacewatch	·	3.9 km	MPC · JPL
283249	2011 ET_{28}	—	January 28, 2004	Kitt Peak	Spacewatch	CYB	5.0 km	MPC · JPL
283250	2011 EC_{29}	—	February 24, 1995	Kitt Peak	Spacewatch	EOS	2.5 km	MPC · JPL
283251	2011 EY_{29}	—	March 10, 2005	Anderson Mesa	LONEOS	(45637) · CYB	5.4 km	MPC · JPL
283252	2011 EL_{53}	—	February 21, 2003	Palomar	NEAT	·	2.0 km	MPC · JPL
283253	2011 EO_{78}	—	March 3, 2005	Kitt Peak	Spacewatch	·	4.3 km	MPC · JPL
283254	2011 FH_{1}	—	November 18, 2003	Kitt Peak	Spacewatch	EOS	2.3 km	MPC · JPL
283255	2011 FA_{3}	—	April 17, 1996	Kitt Peak	Spacewatch	·	2.7 km	MPC · JPL
283256	2011 FG_{4}	—	September 28, 2006	Mount Lemmon	Mount Lemmon Survey	·	1.0 km	MPC · JPL
283257	2011 FA_{8}	—	April 4, 2005	Catalina	CSS	·	4.5 km	MPC · JPL
283258	2011 FH_{18}	—	July 30, 2005	Palomar	NEAT	·	1.0 km	MPC · JPL
283259	2011 FD_{34}	—	January 27, 2007	Mount Lemmon	Mount Lemmon Survey	·	1.3 km	MPC · JPL
283260	2011 FN_{47}	—	September 25, 2005	Kitt Peak	Spacewatch	·	970 m	MPC · JPL
283261	2011 FR_{142}	—	March 27, 2000	Kitt Peak	Spacewatch	·	3.5 km	MPC · JPL
283262	2011 FU_{147}	—	March 1, 1981	Siding Spring	S. J. Bus	·	3.9 km	MPC · JPL
283263	2011 FH_{151}	—	November 3, 2005	Mount Lemmon	Mount Lemmon Survey	·	5.1 km	MPC · JPL
283264	2011 FT_{151}	—	April 7, 2006	Siding Spring	SSS	·	4.0 km	MPC · JPL
283265	2011 FM_{155}	—	August 6, 2007	Lulin	LUSS	·	3.6 km	MPC · JPL
283266	2011 GX_{46}	—	October 15, 2007	Mount Lemmon	Mount Lemmon Survey	·	4.4 km	MPC · JPL
283267	2011 GC_{57}	—	September 24, 2005	Kitt Peak	Spacewatch	V	920 m	MPC · JPL
283268	2011 HB_{4}	—	September 12, 2007	Mount Lemmon	Mount Lemmon Survey	·	6.2 km	MPC · JPL
283269	2011 HY_{5}	—	January 2, 2006	Mount Lemmon	Mount Lemmon Survey	·	1.8 km	MPC · JPL
283270	2011 HS_{12}	—	July 7, 2007	Reedy Creek	J. Broughton	·	2.5 km	MPC · JPL
283271	2011 HS_{18}	—	December 18, 2009	Mount Lemmon	Mount Lemmon Survey	·	1.5 km	MPC · JPL
283272	2011 HR_{19}	—	September 29, 2008	Mount Lemmon	Mount Lemmon Survey	·	5.0 km	MPC · JPL
283273	2011 HU_{25}	—	October 26, 2005	Kitt Peak	Spacewatch	V	840 m	MPC · JPL
283274	2011 HR_{28}	—	November 24, 2009	Kitt Peak	Spacewatch	·	1.3 km	MPC · JPL
283275	2011 HE_{29}	—	July 20, 1993	La Silla	E. W. Elst	·	3.4 km	MPC · JPL
283276	2011 HF_{33}	—	May 20, 2006	Kitt Peak	Spacewatch	·	2.4 km	MPC · JPL
283277 Faber	2011 HX_{34}	Faber	August 13, 2004	Cerro Tololo	Deep Ecliptic Survey	·	1.3 km	MPC · JPL
283278	2011 HE_{36}	—	May 6, 2002	Palomar	NEAT	·	2.3 km	MPC · JPL
283279 Qianweichang	2011 HH_{38}	Qianweichang	May 16, 2007	XuYi	PMO NEO Survey Program	·	2.0 km	MPC · JPL
283280	2011 HC_{39}	—	May 9, 2006	Mount Lemmon	Mount Lemmon Survey	EOS	2.8 km	MPC · JPL
283281	2011 HR_{54}	—	June 5, 2002	Haleakala	NEAT	·	3.2 km	MPC · JPL
283282	2011 HS_{55}	—	April 8, 2005	Socorro	LINEAR	·	3.7 km	MPC · JPL
283283	2011 HF_{63}	—	March 8, 2005	Mount Lemmon	Mount Lemmon Survey	·	4.4 km	MPC · JPL
283284	2011 HK_{66}	—	March 2, 2005	Catalina	CSS	EOS	3.0 km	MPC · JPL
283285	2011 HJ_{67}	—	April 1, 2003	Apache Point	SDSS	PHO	1.1 km	MPC · JPL
283286	2011 HL_{67}	—	March 4, 2006	Catalina	CSS	·	3.0 km	MPC · JPL
283287	2011 HN_{74}	—	June 14, 2002	Socorro	LINEAR	·	2.4 km	MPC · JPL
283288	2011 HQ_{74}	—	October 22, 2001	Palomar	NEAT	·	4.6 km	MPC · JPL
283289	2011 HK_{80}	—	October 10, 2007	Catalina	CSS	·	3.8 km	MPC · JPL
283290	2011 HJ_{81}	—	May 28, 2000	Socorro	LINEAR	·	4.2 km	MPC · JPL
283291	2011 JB_{18}	—	June 30, 2008	Kitt Peak	Spacewatch	·	930 m	MPC · JPL
283292	2011 JQ_{27}	—	January 8, 1994	Kitt Peak	Spacewatch	·	2.9 km	MPC · JPL
283293	2011 JZ_{28}	—	September 19, 2007	Kitt Peak	Spacewatch	·	5.0 km	MPC · JPL
283294	2011 JA_{31}	—	April 5, 2000	Socorro	LINEAR	NYS	1.1 km	MPC · JPL
283295	2011 KK_{1}	—	April 22, 2007	Mount Lemmon	Mount Lemmon Survey	·	1.1 km	MPC · JPL
283296	2011 KZ_{1}	—	August 17, 2001	Palomar	NEAT	·	4.8 km	MPC · JPL
283297	2011 KT_{7}	—	December 21, 2006	Kitt Peak	Spacewatch	·	770 m	MPC · JPL
283298	2011 KB_{8}	—	July 12, 2001	Palomar	NEAT	(2076)	870 m	MPC · JPL
283299	2011 KN_{8}	—	December 19, 2001	Palomar	NEAT	·	1.6 km	MPC · JPL
283300	2011 KT_{8}	—	July 4, 2003	Kitt Peak	Spacewatch	EUN	1.7 km	MPC · JPL

== 283301–283400 ==
back to top

Designation			Discovery			Properties		Ref
Permanent	Provisional	Named after	Date	Site	Discoverer(s)	Category	Diam.	Ref
283301	2011 KA_{9}	—	March 21, 1993	La Silla	SDSS	·	1.0 km	MPC · JPL
283302	2011 KB_{9}	—	February 1, 2005	Kitt Peak	Spacewatch	·	2.6 km	MPC · JPL
283303	2011 KH_{11}	—	June 11, 2004	Palomar	NEAT	·	860 m	MPC · JPL
283304	2011 KL_{22}	—	February 17, 2007	Kitt Peak	Spacewatch	·	810 m	MPC · JPL
283305	2011 KK_{23}	—	April 24, 1998	Kitt Peak	Spacewatch	·	1.7 km	MPC · JPL
283306	2011 KS_{24}	—	March 3, 2005	Kitt Peak	Spacewatch	·	2.1 km	MPC · JPL
283307	2011 KU_{24}	—	April 2, 2006	Kitt Peak	Spacewatch	·	2.1 km	MPC · JPL
283308	2011 KW_{24}	—	November 6, 2008	Kitt Peak	Spacewatch	·	4.8 km	MPC · JPL
283309	2011 KZ_{24}	—	March 26, 2004	Kitt Peak	Spacewatch	·	750 m	MPC · JPL
283310	2011 KB_{25}	—	November 30, 2003	Kitt Peak	Spacewatch	KOR	1.5 km	MPC · JPL
283311	2011 KO_{26}	—	April 15, 2007	Kitt Peak	Spacewatch	·	2.6 km	MPC · JPL
283312	2011 KR_{26}	—	November 3, 2005	Mount Lemmon	Mount Lemmon Survey	V	830 m	MPC · JPL
283313	2011 KE_{27}	—	November 30, 2005	Socorro	LINEAR	·	970 m	MPC · JPL
283314	2011 KG_{29}	—	March 5, 2006	Kitt Peak	Spacewatch	MRX	1.4 km	MPC · JPL
283315	2011 KE_{35}	—	September 30, 1997	Kitt Peak	Spacewatch	·	2.9 km	MPC · JPL
283316	1029 T-3	—	October 17, 1977	Palomar	C. J. van Houten, I. van Houten-Groeneveld, T. Gehrels	·	3.2 km	MPC · JPL
283317	2049 T-3	—	October 16, 1977	Palomar	C. J. van Houten, I. van Houten-Groeneveld, T. Gehrels	·	2.8 km	MPC · JPL
283318	1992 DE_{1}	—	February 26, 1992	Kitt Peak	Spacewatch	HIL · 3:2	8.1 km	MPC · JPL
283319	1992 WR_{4}	—	November 19, 1992	Palomar	E. F. Helin	·	710 m	MPC · JPL
283320	1994 SB_{12}	—	September 29, 1994	Kitt Peak	Spacewatch	·	740 m	MPC · JPL
283321	1995 SR_{27}	—	September 19, 1995	Kitt Peak	Spacewatch	·	970 m	MPC · JPL
283322	1995 SX_{35}	—	September 23, 1995	Kitt Peak	Spacewatch	·	3.2 km	MPC · JPL
283323	1996 AZ_{5}	—	January 12, 1996	Kitt Peak	Spacewatch	·	1.8 km	MPC · JPL
283324	1996 VE_{19}	—	November 7, 1996	Kitt Peak	Spacewatch	·	1.5 km	MPC · JPL
283325	1997 AA_{23}	—	January 10, 1997	Mauna Kea	Veillet, C.	·	4.2 km	MPC · JPL
283326	1997 CE_{2}	—	February 2, 1997	Kitt Peak	Spacewatch	·	1.6 km	MPC · JPL
283327	1997 JN_{5}	—	May 1, 1997	Kitt Peak	Spacewatch	·	2.2 km	MPC · JPL
283328	1997 KN_{2}	—	May 29, 1997	Kitt Peak	Spacewatch	AEO	1.2 km	MPC · JPL
283329	1997 RG_{8}	—	September 11, 1997	Dynic	A. Sugie	·	1.3 km	MPC · JPL
283330	1998 FL_{14}	—	March 26, 1998	Caussols	ODAS	·	1.6 km	MPC · JPL
283331	1998 HJ_{129}	—	April 19, 1998	Socorro	LINEAR	·	1.5 km	MPC · JPL
283332	1998 MW_{17}	—	June 22, 1998	Kitt Peak	Spacewatch	·	1.3 km	MPC · JPL
283333	1998 QW_{29}	—	August 23, 1998	Xinglong	SCAP	ADE	2.6 km	MPC · JPL
283334	1998 VY_{13}	—	November 10, 1998	Socorro	LINEAR	(18466)	3.8 km	MPC · JPL
283335	1998 XN_{6}	—	December 8, 1998	Kitt Peak	Spacewatch	·	2.0 km	MPC · JPL
283336	1999 CW_{133}	—	February 7, 1999	Kitt Peak	Spacewatch	·	1.6 km	MPC · JPL
283337	1999 CW_{137}	—	February 9, 1999	Kitt Peak	Spacewatch	NYS	1.2 km	MPC · JPL
283338	1999 RR_{62}	—	September 7, 1999	Socorro	LINEAR	·	1.1 km	MPC · JPL
283339	1999 RT_{174}	—	September 9, 1999	Socorro	LINEAR	·	1.1 km	MPC · JPL
283340	1999 TY_{165}	—	October 10, 1999	Socorro	LINEAR	(5)	1.4 km	MPC · JPL
283341	1999 TF_{209}	—	October 14, 1999	Socorro	LINEAR	·	1.4 km	MPC · JPL
283342	1999 TV_{249}	—	October 9, 1999	Catalina	CSS	·	1.7 km	MPC · JPL
283343	1999 TA_{263}	—	October 15, 1999	Kitt Peak	Spacewatch	·	1.3 km	MPC · JPL
283344	1999 UE_{30}	—	October 31, 1999	Kitt Peak	Spacewatch	·	1.9 km	MPC · JPL
283345	1999 VT_{13}	—	November 2, 1999	Socorro	LINEAR	H	540 m	MPC · JPL
283346	1999 VG_{35}	—	November 3, 1999	Socorro	LINEAR	·	1.9 km	MPC · JPL
283347	1999 VP_{48}	—	November 3, 1999	Socorro	LINEAR	(5)	1.6 km	MPC · JPL
283348	1999 VH_{51}	—	November 3, 1999	Socorro	LINEAR	·	1.8 km	MPC · JPL
283349	1999 VG_{55}	—	November 4, 1999	Socorro	LINEAR	EUN	1.3 km	MPC · JPL
283350	1999 VL_{61}	—	November 4, 1999	Socorro	LINEAR	·	1.2 km	MPC · JPL
283351	1999 VX_{61}	—	November 4, 1999	Socorro	LINEAR	·	1.4 km	MPC · JPL
283352	1999 VV_{64}	—	November 4, 1999	Socorro	LINEAR	·	1.8 km	MPC · JPL
283353	1999 VX_{89}	—	November 5, 1999	Socorro	LINEAR	(5)	950 m	MPC · JPL
283354	1999 XU_{145}	—	December 7, 1999	Kitt Peak	Spacewatch	·	1.2 km	MPC · JPL
283355	1999 XX_{232}	—	December 12, 1999	Socorro	LINEAR	H	750 m	MPC · JPL
283356	2000 AZ_{29}	—	January 3, 2000	Socorro	LINEAR	·	2.0 km	MPC · JPL
283357	2000 AO_{37}	—	January 3, 2000	Socorro	LINEAR	JUN	1.6 km	MPC · JPL
283358	2000 AS_{44}	—	January 5, 2000	Kitt Peak	Spacewatch	PAD	2.0 km	MPC · JPL
283359	2000 AF_{86}	—	January 5, 2000	Socorro	LINEAR	·	3.1 km	MPC · JPL
283360	2000 AK_{93}	—	January 4, 2000	Socorro	LINEAR	·	2.9 km	MPC · JPL
283361	2000 AU_{146}	—	January 7, 2000	Socorro	LINEAR	·	2.2 km	MPC · JPL
283362	2000 AL_{185}	—	January 7, 2000	Socorro	LINEAR	·	2.8 km	MPC · JPL
283363	2000 AQ_{196}	—	January 8, 2000	Socorro	LINEAR	·	3.2 km	MPC · JPL
283364	2000 BE_{20}	—	January 26, 2000	Kitt Peak	Spacewatch	AGN	1.2 km	MPC · JPL
283365	2000 BO_{20}	—	January 26, 2000	Kitt Peak	Spacewatch	·	2.1 km	MPC · JPL
283366	2000 CW_{114}	—	February 1, 2000	Kitt Peak	Spacewatch	fast	3.4 km	MPC · JPL
283367	2000 DO_{63}	—	February 29, 2000	Socorro	LINEAR	·	3.0 km	MPC · JPL
283368	2000 DW_{104}	—	February 29, 2000	Socorro	LINEAR	·	1.4 km	MPC · JPL
283369	2000 EX_{13}	—	March 3, 2000	Socorro	LINEAR	·	1.1 km	MPC · JPL
283370	2000 EF_{45}	—	March 9, 2000	Socorro	LINEAR	·	1.2 km	MPC · JPL
283371	2000 ES_{99}	—	March 12, 2000	Kitt Peak	Spacewatch	HOF	3.0 km	MPC · JPL
283372	2000 FE_{7}	—	March 29, 2000	Kitt Peak	Spacewatch	·	810 m	MPC · JPL
283373	2000 GL_{119}	—	April 3, 2000	Kitt Peak	Spacewatch	EUN	1.8 km	MPC · JPL
283374	2000 HA_{46}	—	April 29, 2000	Socorro	LINEAR	H	690 m	MPC · JPL
283375	2000 HZ_{94}	—	April 29, 2000	Anderson Mesa	LONEOS	H	840 m	MPC · JPL
283376	2000 KJ_{39}	—	May 24, 2000	Kitt Peak	Spacewatch	·	920 m	MPC · JPL
283377	2000 PO_{9}	—	August 8, 2000	Socorro	LINEAR	·	2.2 km	MPC · JPL
283378	2000 QV_{1}	—	August 23, 2000	Socorro	LINEAR	T_{j} (2.98)	3.7 km	MPC · JPL
283379	2000 QY_{2}	—	August 24, 2000	Socorro	LINEAR	·	1.3 km	MPC · JPL
283380	2000 QY_{6}	—	August 24, 2000	Socorro	LINEAR	·	1.9 km	MPC · JPL
283381	2000 QH_{7}	—	August 25, 2000	Socorro	LINEAR	PHO	1.2 km	MPC · JPL
283382	2000 QY_{23}	—	August 25, 2000	Socorro	LINEAR	MAS	900 m	MPC · JPL
283383	2000 QH_{43}	—	August 24, 2000	Socorro	LINEAR	·	1.1 km	MPC · JPL
283384	2000 QR_{47}	—	August 24, 2000	Socorro	LINEAR	·	1.4 km	MPC · JPL
283385	2000 QW_{71}	—	August 24, 2000	Socorro	LINEAR	·	1.7 km	MPC · JPL
283386	2000 QN_{81}	—	August 24, 2000	Socorro	LINEAR	NYS	1.4 km	MPC · JPL
283387	2000 QC_{167}	—	August 31, 2000	Socorro	LINEAR	·	1.6 km	MPC · JPL
283388	2000 QO_{201}	—	August 29, 2000	Socorro	LINEAR	NYS	1.6 km	MPC · JPL
283389	2000 QV_{202}	—	August 29, 2000	Socorro	LINEAR	·	1.6 km	MPC · JPL
283390	2000 QF_{205}	—	August 31, 2000	Socorro	LINEAR	TIR	4.1 km	MPC · JPL
283391	2000 RD_{25}	—	September 1, 2000	Socorro	LINEAR	·	2.5 km	MPC · JPL
283392	2000 RR_{36}	—	September 1, 2000	Socorro	LINEAR	H	950 m	MPC · JPL
283393	2000 RO_{49}	—	September 5, 2000	Socorro	LINEAR	·	2.2 km	MPC · JPL
283394	2000 RR_{82}	—	September 1, 2000	Socorro	LINEAR	TIR	3.8 km	MPC · JPL
283395	2000 RK_{96}	—	September 4, 2000	Kitt Peak	Spacewatch	·	1.9 km	MPC · JPL
283396	2000 RC_{98}	—	September 5, 2000	Anderson Mesa	LONEOS	L5	17 km	MPC · JPL
283397	2000 RV_{100}	—	September 5, 2000	Anderson Mesa	LONEOS	T_{j} (2.96)	6.2 km	MPC · JPL
283398	2000 RE_{102}	—	September 5, 2000	Anderson Mesa	LONEOS	·	2.2 km	MPC · JPL
283399	2000 SZ_{6}	—	September 22, 2000	Socorro	LINEAR	·	3.3 km	MPC · JPL
283400	2000 SR_{15}	—	September 23, 2000	Socorro	LINEAR	·	2.0 km	MPC · JPL

== 283401–283500 ==
back to top

Designation			Discovery			Properties		Ref
Permanent	Provisional	Named after	Date	Site	Discoverer(s)	Category	Diam.	Ref
283401	2000 SV_{15}	—	September 23, 2000	Socorro	LINEAR	L5 · slow	17 km	MPC · JPL
283402	2000 SX_{16}	—	September 23, 2000	Socorro	LINEAR	L5	20 km	MPC · JPL
283403	2000 SX_{18}	—	September 23, 2000	Socorro	LINEAR	·	1.6 km	MPC · JPL
283404	2000 SW_{25}	—	September 23, 2000	Socorro	LINEAR	PHO	1.5 km	MPC · JPL
283405	2000 SK_{26}	—	September 23, 2000	Socorro	LINEAR	·	5.4 km	MPC · JPL
283406	2000 SA_{33}	—	September 24, 2000	Socorro	LINEAR	NYS	1.8 km	MPC · JPL
283407	2000 SZ_{39}	—	September 24, 2000	Socorro	LINEAR	·	1.7 km	MPC · JPL
283408	2000 SA_{63}	—	September 24, 2000	Socorro	LINEAR	V	950 m	MPC · JPL
283409	2000 SS_{65}	—	September 24, 2000	Socorro	LINEAR	·	1.7 km	MPC · JPL
283410	2000 SC_{100}	—	September 23, 2000	Socorro	LINEAR	NYS	1.7 km	MPC · JPL
283411	2000 SJ_{106}	—	September 24, 2000	Socorro	LINEAR	MAS	910 m	MPC · JPL
283412	2000 SE_{112}	—	September 24, 2000	Socorro	LINEAR	NYS	2.0 km	MPC · JPL
283413	2000 SS_{130}	—	September 22, 2000	Socorro	LINEAR	·	4.0 km	MPC · JPL
283414	2000 SZ_{139}	—	September 23, 2000	Socorro	LINEAR	·	5.6 km	MPC · JPL
283415	2000 SU_{148}	—	September 24, 2000	Socorro	LINEAR	·	1.8 km	MPC · JPL
283416	2000 SO_{153}	—	September 24, 2000	Socorro	LINEAR	·	1.4 km	MPC · JPL
283417	2000 SR_{180}	—	September 28, 2000	Socorro	LINEAR	EUP	6.3 km	MPC · JPL
283418	2000 SV_{197}	—	September 24, 2000	Socorro	LINEAR	VER	3.7 km	MPC · JPL
283419	2000 SK_{201}	—	September 24, 2000	Socorro	LINEAR	L5	13 km	MPC · JPL
283420	2000 SO_{228}	—	September 28, 2000	Socorro	LINEAR	MAS	1.1 km	MPC · JPL
283421	2000 SL_{249}	—	September 24, 2000	Socorro	LINEAR	·	1.8 km	MPC · JPL
283422	2000 SH_{276}	—	September 30, 2000	Socorro	LINEAR	·	3.1 km	MPC · JPL
283423	2000 SZ_{285}	—	September 24, 2000	Socorro	LINEAR	·	4.7 km	MPC · JPL
283424	2000 SN_{317}	—	September 30, 2000	Socorro	LINEAR	L5	16 km	MPC · JPL
283425	2000 SX_{322}	—	September 28, 2000	Socorro	LINEAR	·	4.1 km	MPC · JPL
283426	2000 SL_{324}	—	September 28, 2000	Kitt Peak	Spacewatch	MAS	880 m	MPC · JPL
283427	2000 SB_{363}	—	September 21, 2000	Anderson Mesa	LONEOS	H	760 m	MPC · JPL
283428	2000 TZ_{13}	—	October 1, 2000	Socorro	LINEAR	·	1.2 km	MPC · JPL
283429	2000 TW_{29}	—	October 4, 2000	Socorro	LINEAR	·	2.7 km	MPC · JPL
283430	2000 TB_{33}	—	October 4, 2000	Socorro	LINEAR	PHO	1.7 km	MPC · JPL
283431	2000 TZ_{40}	—	October 1, 2000	Anderson Mesa	LONEOS	·	1.7 km	MPC · JPL
283432	2000 TH_{41}	—	October 1, 2000	Anderson Mesa	LONEOS	EOS	2.7 km	MPC · JPL
283433	2000 UB_{11}	—	October 25, 2000	Socorro	LINEAR	·	3.2 km	MPC · JPL
283434	2000 UR_{71}	—	October 25, 2000	Socorro	LINEAR	·	2.0 km	MPC · JPL
283435	2000 UJ_{75}	—	October 31, 2000	Socorro	LINEAR	PHO	3.0 km	MPC · JPL
283436	2000 UY_{105}	—	October 29, 2000	Socorro	LINEAR	·	2.0 km	MPC · JPL
283437	2000 US_{106}	—	October 30, 2000	Socorro	LINEAR	·	1.5 km	MPC · JPL
283438	2000 VB_{54}	—	November 3, 2000	Socorro	LINEAR	·	1.4 km	MPC · JPL
283439	2000 WE_{10}	—	November 23, 2000	Bisei SG Center	BATTeRS	·	2.0 km	MPC · JPL
283440	2000 WE_{12}	—	November 23, 2000	Kitt Peak	Spacewatch	·	1.8 km	MPC · JPL
283441	2000 WU_{71}	—	November 19, 2000	Socorro	LINEAR	·	2.3 km	MPC · JPL
283442	2000 WO_{84}	—	November 20, 2000	Socorro	LINEAR	·	1.7 km	MPC · JPL
283443	2000 WO_{105}	—	November 28, 2000	Kitt Peak	Spacewatch	·	1.5 km	MPC · JPL
283444	2000 WS_{111}	—	November 20, 2000	Socorro	LINEAR	·	2.2 km	MPC · JPL
283445	2000 WP_{138}	—	November 21, 2000	Socorro	LINEAR	·	3.3 km	MPC · JPL
283446	2000 WD_{168}	—	November 25, 2000	Socorro	LINEAR	PHO	1.5 km	MPC · JPL
283447	2000 WA_{190}	—	November 18, 2000	Anderson Mesa	LONEOS	·	2.3 km	MPC · JPL
283448	2000 YK_{11}	—	December 19, 2000	Haleakala	NEAT	T_{j} (2.98)	6.3 km	MPC · JPL
283449	2000 YC_{65}	—	December 30, 2000	Kitt Peak	Spacewatch	·	1.5 km	MPC · JPL
283450	2001 AW_{1}	—	January 2, 2001	Anderson Mesa	LONEOS	·	2.4 km	MPC · JPL
283451	2001 DL_{47}	—	February 16, 2001	Kitt Peak	Spacewatch	·	2.1 km	MPC · JPL
283452	2001 FJ_{4}	—	March 19, 2001	Kitt Peak	Spacewatch	·	2.1 km	MPC · JPL
283453	2001 FV_{104}	—	March 18, 2001	Anderson Mesa	LONEOS	·	2.6 km	MPC · JPL
283454	2001 FX_{196}	—	March 28, 2001	Kitt Peak	Spacewatch	GEF	1.9 km	MPC · JPL
283455 Philipkrider	2001 FV_{221}	Philipkrider	March 22, 2001	Kitt Peak	SKADS	·	2.2 km	MPC · JPL
283456	2001 HB_{46}	—	April 17, 2001	Anderson Mesa	LONEOS	GEF	2.1 km	MPC · JPL
283457	2001 MQ_{3}	—	June 19, 2001	Palomar	NEAT	AMO	540 m	MPC · JPL
283458	2001 NZ_{4}	—	July 13, 2001	Palomar	NEAT	·	720 m	MPC · JPL
283459	2001 OA_{78}	—	July 26, 2001	Palomar	NEAT	·	1.0 km	MPC · JPL
283460	2001 PD_{1}	—	August 4, 2001	Haleakala	NEAT	AMO	720 m	MPC · JPL
283461 Leacipaola	2001 PX_{28}	Leacipaola	August 14, 2001	San Marcello	L. Tesi	·	710 m	MPC · JPL
283462	2001 PT_{61}	—	August 13, 2001	Haleakala	NEAT	·	870 m	MPC · JPL
283463	2001 QZ_{37}	—	August 16, 2001	Socorro	LINEAR	·	810 m	MPC · JPL
283464	2001 QN_{72}	—	August 21, 2001	Kitt Peak	Spacewatch	·	840 m	MPC · JPL
283465	2001 QD_{111}	—	August 23, 2001	Socorro	LINEAR	·	6.2 km	MPC · JPL
283466	2001 QZ_{116}	—	August 17, 2001	Socorro	LINEAR	·	2.5 km	MPC · JPL
283467	2001 QA_{124}	—	August 19, 2001	Socorro	LINEAR	·	950 m	MPC · JPL
283468	2001 QJ_{145}	—	August 24, 2001	Kitt Peak	Spacewatch	·	2.3 km	MPC · JPL
283469	2001 QK_{151}	—	August 23, 2001	Socorro	LINEAR	·	1.3 km	MPC · JPL
283470	2001 QM_{153}	—	August 26, 2001	Socorro	LINEAR	·	1.5 km	MPC · JPL
283471	2001 QW_{172}	—	August 25, 2001	Socorro	LINEAR	·	860 m	MPC · JPL
283472	2001 QT_{205}	—	August 23, 2001	Anderson Mesa	LONEOS	·	760 m	MPC · JPL
283473	2001 QA_{233}	—	August 24, 2001	Socorro	LINEAR	·	660 m	MPC · JPL
283474	2001 QJ_{259}	—	August 25, 2001	Socorro	LINEAR	EOS	2.4 km	MPC · JPL
283475	2001 QY_{289}	—	August 16, 2001	Socorro	LINEAR	·	1.2 km	MPC · JPL
283476	2001 QY_{293}	—	August 24, 2001	Anderson Mesa	LONEOS	·	810 m	MPC · JPL
283477	2001 QY_{305}	—	August 19, 2001	Cerro Tololo	M. W. Buie	·	4.4 km	MPC · JPL
283478	2001 QR_{327}	—	August 17, 2001	Palomar	NEAT	·	1.7 km	MPC · JPL
283479	2001 RO_{40}	—	September 11, 2001	Socorro	LINEAR	·	2.6 km	MPC · JPL
283480	2001 RT_{64}	—	September 10, 2001	Socorro	LINEAR	·	2.8 km	MPC · JPL
283481	2001 RT_{96}	—	September 12, 2001	Kitt Peak	Spacewatch	·	670 m	MPC · JPL
283482	2001 RU_{113}	—	September 12, 2001	Socorro	LINEAR	·	760 m	MPC · JPL
283483	2001 RC_{130}	—	September 12, 2001	Socorro	LINEAR	·	1.0 km	MPC · JPL
283484	2001 SR_{7}	—	September 18, 2001	Kitt Peak	Spacewatch	·	2.1 km	MPC · JPL
283485	2001 SQ_{18}	—	September 16, 2001	Socorro	LINEAR	·	2.2 km	MPC · JPL
283486	2001 SW_{24}	—	September 16, 2001	Socorro	LINEAR	·	1.3 km	MPC · JPL
283487	2001 SZ_{40}	—	September 16, 2001	Socorro	LINEAR	·	780 m	MPC · JPL
283488	2001 SU_{102}	—	September 20, 2001	Socorro	LINEAR	·	900 m	MPC · JPL
283489	2001 SJ_{103}	—	September 20, 2001	Socorro	LINEAR	·	660 m	MPC · JPL
283490	2001 SZ_{116}	—	September 16, 2001	Socorro	LINEAR	BAP	1.2 km	MPC · JPL
283491	2001 ST_{122}	—	September 16, 2001	Socorro	LINEAR	·	950 m	MPC · JPL
283492	2001 SH_{131}	—	September 16, 2001	Socorro	LINEAR	·	910 m	MPC · JPL
283493	2001 SA_{132}	—	September 16, 2001	Socorro	LINEAR	·	1.4 km	MPC · JPL
283494	2001 SZ_{155}	—	September 17, 2001	Socorro	LINEAR	H	720 m	MPC · JPL
283495	2001 SZ_{156}	—	September 17, 2001	Socorro	LINEAR	(2076)	1.0 km	MPC · JPL
283496	2001 ST_{157}	—	September 17, 2001	Socorro	LINEAR	·	3.0 km	MPC · JPL
283497	2001 SL_{183}	—	September 19, 2001	Socorro	LINEAR	·	640 m	MPC · JPL
283498	2001 SO_{227}	—	September 19, 2001	Socorro	LINEAR	·	3.0 km	MPC · JPL
283499	2001 SH_{232}	—	September 19, 2001	Socorro	LINEAR	·	2.6 km	MPC · JPL
283500	2001 SK_{258}	—	September 20, 2001	Socorro	LINEAR	EOS	2.3 km	MPC · JPL

== 283501–283600 ==
back to top

Designation			Discovery			Properties		Ref
Permanent	Provisional	Named after	Date	Site	Discoverer(s)	Category	Diam.	Ref
283501	2001 SW_{263}	—	September 24, 2001	Socorro	LINEAR	PHO	3.3 km	MPC · JPL
283502	2001 SJ_{290}	—	September 29, 2001	Palomar	NEAT	·	1.0 km	MPC · JPL
283503	2001 SU_{299}	—	September 20, 2001	Socorro	LINEAR	·	860 m	MPC · JPL
283504	2001 SF_{309}	—	September 22, 2001	Socorro	LINEAR	·	2.8 km	MPC · JPL
283505	2001 SA_{325}	—	September 16, 2001	Socorro	LINEAR	V	650 m	MPC · JPL
283506	2001 SV_{334}	—	September 20, 2001	Kitt Peak	Spacewatch	·	1.9 km	MPC · JPL
283507	2001 SN_{338}	—	September 20, 2001	Socorro	LINEAR	·	1.5 km	MPC · JPL
283508	2001 ST_{340}	—	September 21, 2001	Socorro	LINEAR	·	530 m	MPC · JPL
283509	2001 SV_{346}	—	September 25, 2001	Palomar	NEAT	·	1.2 km	MPC · JPL
283510	2001 SD_{355}	—	September 19, 2001	Palomar	NEAT	L5	10 km	MPC · JPL
283511	2001 TZ_{13}	—	October 12, 2001	Ondřejov	P. Kušnirák	·	2.6 km	MPC · JPL
283512	2001 TH_{24}	—	October 14, 2001	Socorro	LINEAR	L5	15 km	MPC · JPL
283513	2001 TN_{24}	—	October 14, 2001	Socorro	LINEAR	L5	10 km	MPC · JPL
283514	2001 TL_{26}	—	October 14, 2001	Socorro	LINEAR	·	870 m	MPC · JPL
283515	2001 TN_{28}	—	October 14, 2001	Socorro	LINEAR	·	850 m	MPC · JPL
283516	2001 TA_{29}	—	October 14, 2001	Socorro	LINEAR	HYG	3.5 km	MPC · JPL
283517	2001 TQ_{30}	—	October 14, 2001	Socorro	LINEAR	HYG	4.0 km	MPC · JPL
283518	2001 TD_{31}	—	October 14, 2001	Socorro	LINEAR	·	5.4 km	MPC · JPL
283519	2001 TP_{47}	—	October 14, 2001	Cima Ekar	ADAS	L5	10 km	MPC · JPL
283520	2001 TU_{47}	—	October 14, 2001	Cima Ekar	ADAS	V	800 m	MPC · JPL
283521	2001 TM_{83}	—	October 14, 2001	Socorro	LINEAR	·	3.5 km	MPC · JPL
283522	2001 TF_{92}	—	October 14, 2001	Socorro	LINEAR	·	730 m	MPC · JPL
283523	2001 TX_{112}	—	October 14, 2001	Socorro	LINEAR	·	1.2 km	MPC · JPL
283524	2001 TD_{118}	—	October 15, 2001	Socorro	LINEAR	·	3.1 km	MPC · JPL
283525	2001 TE_{120}	—	October 15, 2001	Socorro	LINEAR	·	4.8 km	MPC · JPL
283526	2001 TH_{130}	—	October 15, 2001	Kitt Peak	Spacewatch	V	800 m	MPC · JPL
283527	2001 TG_{131}	—	October 10, 2001	Palomar	NEAT	·	2.2 km	MPC · JPL
283528	2001 TF_{141}	—	October 10, 2001	Palomar	NEAT	·	1.1 km	MPC · JPL
283529	2001 TV_{173}	—	October 14, 2001	Socorro	LINEAR	·	2.8 km	MPC · JPL
283530	2001 TT_{175}	—	October 14, 2001	Socorro	LINEAR	·	840 m	MPC · JPL
283531	2001 TJ_{179}	—	October 14, 2001	Socorro	LINEAR	EOS	2.9 km	MPC · JPL
283532	2001 TW_{184}	—	October 14, 2001	Socorro	LINEAR	L5	10 km	MPC · JPL
283533	2001 TR_{194}	—	October 15, 2001	Socorro	LINEAR	·	3.7 km	MPC · JPL
283534	2001 TQ_{208}	—	October 11, 2001	Palomar	NEAT	·	720 m	MPC · JPL
283535	2001 TE_{216}	—	October 13, 2001	Palomar	NEAT	·	3.9 km	MPC · JPL
283536	2001 TA_{218}	—	October 14, 2001	Socorro	LINEAR	·	880 m	MPC · JPL
283537	2001 TN_{223}	—	October 14, 2001	Socorro	LINEAR	·	580 m	MPC · JPL
283538	2001 TB_{234}	—	October 15, 2001	Kitt Peak	Spacewatch	L5	10 km	MPC · JPL
283539	2001 TK_{240}	—	October 13, 2001	Anderson Mesa	LONEOS	·	870 m	MPC · JPL
283540	2001 UA_{19}	—	October 16, 2001	Palomar	NEAT	·	1 km	MPC · JPL
283541	2001 UA_{41}	—	October 17, 2001	Socorro	LINEAR	·	3.8 km	MPC · JPL
283542	2001 UN_{53}	—	October 17, 2001	Socorro	LINEAR	·	4.8 km	MPC · JPL
283543	2001 UG_{59}	—	October 17, 2001	Socorro	LINEAR	L5	9.9 km	MPC · JPL
283544	2001 UK_{89}	—	October 22, 2001	Palomar	NEAT	EOS	2.8 km	MPC · JPL
283545	2001 UL_{97}	—	October 17, 2001	Socorro	LINEAR	·	2.2 km	MPC · JPL
283546	2001 UK_{123}	—	October 22, 2001	Socorro	LINEAR	H	800 m	MPC · JPL
283547	2001 UQ_{124}	—	October 22, 2001	Palomar	NEAT	·	3.0 km	MPC · JPL
283548	2001 UW_{131}	—	October 20, 2001	Socorro	LINEAR	·	790 m	MPC · JPL
283549	2001 UJ_{134}	—	October 21, 2001	Socorro	LINEAR	L5	11 km	MPC · JPL
283550	2001 UM_{140}	—	October 23, 2001	Socorro	LINEAR	·	1.7 km	MPC · JPL
283551	2001 UY_{172}	—	October 18, 2001	Palomar	NEAT	V	690 m	MPC · JPL
283552	2001 UY_{220}	—	October 21, 2001	Socorro	LINEAR	·	860 m	MPC · JPL
283553	2001 UJ_{225}	—	October 16, 2001	Palomar	NEAT	L5	9.1 km	MPC · JPL
283554	2001 UR_{227}	—	October 16, 2001	Palomar	NEAT	·	2.6 km	MPC · JPL
283555	2001 UV_{230}	—	October 23, 2001	Palomar	NEAT	·	2.2 km	MPC · JPL
283556	2001 VT_{1}	—	November 8, 2001	Socorro	LINEAR	H	890 m	MPC · JPL
283557	2001 VV_{2}	—	November 9, 2001	Socorro	LINEAR	slow	1.3 km	MPC · JPL
283558	2001 VO_{32}	—	November 9, 2001	Socorro	LINEAR	V	920 m	MPC · JPL
283559	2001 VW_{32}	—	November 9, 2001	Socorro	LINEAR	·	4.0 km	MPC · JPL
283560	2001 VF_{56}	—	November 10, 2001	Socorro	LINEAR	L5	13 km	MPC · JPL
283561	2001 VP_{57}	—	November 10, 2001	Socorro	LINEAR	·	1.1 km	MPC · JPL
283562	2001 VK_{60}	—	November 10, 2001	Socorro	LINEAR	·	4.4 km	MPC · JPL
283563	2001 VA_{63}	—	November 10, 2001	Socorro	LINEAR	·	4.0 km	MPC · JPL
283564	2001 VB_{74}	—	November 11, 2001	Socorro	LINEAR	TIR	3.7 km	MPC · JPL
283565	2001 VR_{93}	—	November 15, 2001	Socorro	LINEAR	·	3.2 km	MPC · JPL
283566	2001 VS_{107}	—	October 21, 2001	Socorro	LINEAR	·	790 m	MPC · JPL
283567	2001 VH_{108}	—	November 12, 2001	Socorro	LINEAR	·	800 m	MPC · JPL
283568	2001 VF_{128}	—	November 11, 2001	Apache Point	SDSS	V	780 m	MPC · JPL
283569	2001 VM_{133}	—	November 11, 2001	Apache Point	SDSS	V	750 m	MPC · JPL
283570	2001 WN_{18}	—	November 17, 2001	Socorro	LINEAR	·	4.1 km	MPC · JPL
283571	2001 WL_{26}	—	November 17, 2001	Socorro	LINEAR	·	2.9 km	MPC · JPL
283572	2001 WF_{75}	—	November 20, 2001	Socorro	LINEAR	THM	2.7 km	MPC · JPL
283573	2001 WM_{77}	—	November 20, 2001	Socorro	LINEAR	·	1.3 km	MPC · JPL
283574	2001 XV_{20}	—	December 9, 2001	Socorro	LINEAR	·	1.8 km	MPC · JPL
283575	2001 XB_{32}	—	December 7, 2001	Kitt Peak	Spacewatch	THM	2.9 km	MPC · JPL
283576	2001 XT_{38}	—	December 9, 2001	Socorro	LINEAR	·	1.6 km	MPC · JPL
283577	2001 XO_{67}	—	December 10, 2001	Socorro	LINEAR	·	2.9 km	MPC · JPL
283578	2001 XP_{76}	—	December 11, 2001	Socorro	LINEAR	·	4.1 km	MPC · JPL
283579	2001 XU_{80}	—	December 11, 2001	Socorro	LINEAR	·	3.5 km	MPC · JPL
283580	2001 XC_{97}	—	December 10, 2001	Socorro	LINEAR	·	4.1 km	MPC · JPL
283581	2001 XN_{109}	—	December 11, 2001	Socorro	LINEAR	·	3.6 km	MPC · JPL
283582	2001 XP_{134}	—	December 14, 2001	Socorro	LINEAR	·	1.7 km	MPC · JPL
283583	2001 XK_{182}	—	December 14, 2001	Socorro	LINEAR	H	720 m	MPC · JPL
283584	2001 XP_{183}	—	December 14, 2001	Socorro	LINEAR	EUN	2.3 km	MPC · JPL
283585	2001 XR_{200}	—	December 15, 2001	Socorro	LINEAR	·	1.6 km	MPC · JPL
283586	2001 XJ_{205}	—	December 11, 2001	Socorro	LINEAR	·	5.1 km	MPC · JPL
283587	2001 XH_{228}	—	December 15, 2001	Socorro	LINEAR	TIR	4.0 km	MPC · JPL
283588	2001 XN_{229}	—	December 15, 2001	Socorro	LINEAR	·	1.8 km	MPC · JPL
283589	2001 XQ_{233}	—	December 15, 2001	Socorro	LINEAR	·	4.2 km	MPC · JPL
283590	2001 XD_{242}	—	December 14, 2001	Socorro	LINEAR	·	3.9 km	MPC · JPL
283591	2001 XV_{245}	—	December 15, 2001	Socorro	LINEAR	·	1.1 km	MPC · JPL
283592	2001 XK_{262}	—	December 13, 2001	Palomar	NEAT	·	3.0 km	MPC · JPL
283593	2001 YU_{4}	—	December 23, 2001	Kingsnake	J. V. McClusky	H	730 m	MPC · JPL
283594	2001 YF_{12}	—	December 17, 2001	Socorro	LINEAR	·	5.6 km	MPC · JPL
283595	2001 YP_{19}	—	December 17, 2001	Socorro	LINEAR	·	1.6 km	MPC · JPL
283596	2001 YR_{33}	—	December 18, 2001	Socorro	LINEAR	·	3.7 km	MPC · JPL
283597	2001 YE_{58}	—	December 18, 2001	Socorro	LINEAR	(2076)	1.0 km	MPC · JPL
283598	2001 YZ_{68}	—	December 18, 2001	Socorro	LINEAR	V	950 m	MPC · JPL
283599	2001 YU_{103}	—	December 17, 2001	Socorro	LINEAR	MAS	1.0 km	MPC · JPL
283600	2001 YJ_{110}	—	December 22, 2001	Socorro	LINEAR	·	5.3 km	MPC · JPL

== 283601–283700 ==
back to top

Designation			Discovery			Properties		Ref
Permanent	Provisional	Named after	Date	Site	Discoverer(s)	Category	Diam.	Ref
283601	2001 YW_{114}	—	December 20, 2001	Haleakala	NEAT	·	2.8 km	MPC · JPL
283602	2001 YL_{118}	—	December 18, 2001	Socorro	LINEAR	TIR	4.3 km	MPC · JPL
283603	2001 YH_{153}	—	December 19, 2001	Anderson Mesa	LONEOS	EUN	1.7 km	MPC · JPL
283604	2002 AV_{49}	—	January 9, 2002	Socorro	LINEAR	·	1.6 km	MPC · JPL
283605	2002 AH_{96}	—	January 8, 2002	Socorro	LINEAR	·	1.2 km	MPC · JPL
283606	2002 AX_{96}	—	January 8, 2002	Socorro	LINEAR	·	1.9 km	MPC · JPL
283607	2002 AB_{99}	—	January 8, 2002	Socorro	LINEAR	·	1.6 km	MPC · JPL
283608	2002 AK_{131}	—	January 14, 2002	Socorro	LINEAR	H	790 m	MPC · JPL
283609	2002 AT_{173}	—	January 14, 2002	Socorro	LINEAR	·	2.0 km	MPC · JPL
283610	2002 CO_{8}	—	February 5, 2002	Palomar	NEAT	·	1.4 km	MPC · JPL
283611	2002 CD_{23}	—	February 5, 2002	Haleakala	NEAT	·	6.2 km	MPC · JPL
283612	2002 CV_{43}	—	February 8, 2002	Socorro	LINEAR	H	980 m	MPC · JPL
283613	2002 CG_{48}	—	February 3, 2002	Haleakala	NEAT	·	2.2 km	MPC · JPL
283614	2002 CQ_{50}	—	February 12, 2002	Desert Eagle	W. K. Y. Yeung	·	1.9 km	MPC · JPL
283615	2002 CG_{66}	—	February 7, 2002	Socorro	LINEAR	·	3.2 km	MPC · JPL
283616	2002 CL_{87}	—	February 7, 2002	Socorro	LINEAR	·	2.1 km	MPC · JPL
283617	2002 CH_{110}	—	February 7, 2002	Socorro	LINEAR	GEF	1.6 km	MPC · JPL
283618	2002 CB_{138}	—	February 8, 2002	Socorro	LINEAR	T_{j} (2.96)	5.3 km	MPC · JPL
283619	2002 CE_{144}	—	February 9, 2002	Socorro	LINEAR	·	1.7 km	MPC · JPL
283620	2002 CO_{153}	—	February 8, 2002	Kitt Peak	Spacewatch	·	1.2 km	MPC · JPL
283621	2002 CO_{172}	—	February 8, 2002	Socorro	LINEAR	·	1.5 km	MPC · JPL
283622	2002 CQ_{175}	—	February 10, 2002	Socorro	LINEAR	·	1.8 km	MPC · JPL
283623	2002 CU_{175}	—	February 10, 2002	Socorro	LINEAR	·	1.8 km	MPC · JPL
283624	2002 CZ_{194}	—	February 10, 2002	Socorro	LINEAR	·	1.4 km	MPC · JPL
283625	2002 CU_{208}	—	February 10, 2002	Socorro	LINEAR	·	2.5 km	MPC · JPL
283626	2002 CK_{210}	—	February 10, 2002	Socorro	LINEAR	·	1.7 km	MPC · JPL
283627	2002 CK_{230}	—	February 12, 2002	Kitt Peak	Spacewatch	·	1.3 km	MPC · JPL
283628	2002 CN_{273}	—	February 8, 2002	Kitt Peak	M. W. Buie	·	1.6 km	MPC · JPL
283629	2002 CK_{274}	—	February 8, 2002	Kitt Peak	Spacewatch	·	1.5 km	MPC · JPL
283630	2002 CV_{309}	—	February 6, 2002	Palomar	NEAT	·	1.8 km	MPC · JPL
283631	2002 DO_{10}	—	February 20, 2002	Socorro	LINEAR	·	1.5 km	MPC · JPL
283632	2002 DL_{17}	—	February 20, 2002	Anderson Mesa	LONEOS	H	950 m	MPC · JPL
283633	2002 EG_{5}	—	March 10, 2002	Cima Ekar	ADAS	·	1.2 km	MPC · JPL
283634	2002 EM_{39}	—	March 9, 2002	Socorro	LINEAR	·	2.2 km	MPC · JPL
283635	2002 EE_{50}	—	March 12, 2002	Palomar	NEAT	·	2.0 km	MPC · JPL
283636	2002 EZ_{112}	—	March 10, 2002	Kitt Peak	Spacewatch	·	1.8 km	MPC · JPL
283637	2002 EX_{160}	—	March 9, 2002	Anderson Mesa	LONEOS	·	3.0 km	MPC · JPL
283638	2002 FL_{22}	—	March 19, 2002	Socorro	LINEAR	·	1.9 km	MPC · JPL
283639	2002 FT_{22}	—	March 19, 2002	Palomar	NEAT	·	2.3 km	MPC · JPL
283640	2002 GC_{16}	—	April 15, 2002	Socorro	LINEAR	·	1.6 km	MPC · JPL
283641	2002 GX_{55}	—	April 5, 2002	Palomar	NEAT	·	2.4 km	MPC · JPL
283642	2002 GJ_{56}	—	April 5, 2002	Palomar	NEAT	·	1.6 km	MPC · JPL
283643	2002 GJ_{71}	—	April 9, 2002	Anderson Mesa	LONEOS	·	1.7 km	MPC · JPL
283644	2002 GV_{133}	—	April 12, 2002	Socorro	LINEAR	·	1.7 km	MPC · JPL
283645	2002 GJ_{182}	—	April 5, 2002	Palomar	NEAT	·	2.2 km	MPC · JPL
283646	2002 HA_{6}	—	April 18, 2002	Kitt Peak	Spacewatch	·	2.1 km	MPC · JPL
283647	2002 JW_{36}	—	May 7, 2002	Anderson Mesa	LONEOS	·	1.4 km	MPC · JPL
283648	2002 JV_{87}	—	May 11, 2002	Socorro	LINEAR	·	2.3 km	MPC · JPL
283649	2002 JS_{145}	—	May 14, 2002	Palomar	NEAT	·	2.2 km	MPC · JPL
283650	2002 JJ_{150}	—	September 10, 2007	Kitt Peak	Spacewatch	·	1.5 km	MPC · JPL
283651	2002 KR_{13}	—	May 19, 2002	Palomar	NEAT	·	2.3 km	MPC · JPL
283652	2002 KU_{15}	—	May 18, 2002	Palomar	NEAT	·	1.5 km	MPC · JPL
283653	2002 LH_{13}	—	June 6, 2002	Socorro	LINEAR	·	1.8 km	MPC · JPL
283654	2002 LJ_{47}	—	June 10, 2002	Socorro	LINEAR	·	2.6 km	MPC · JPL
283655	2002 LB_{62}	—	June 11, 2002	Palomar	NEAT	·	2.3 km	MPC · JPL
283656	2002 MZ_{1}	—	June 16, 2002	Palomar	NEAT	·	2.7 km	MPC · JPL
283657	2002 NT_{57}	—	July 12, 2002	Palomar	NEAT	·	2.3 km	MPC · JPL
283658	2002 OE_{15}	—	July 18, 2002	Socorro	LINEAR	·	2.4 km	MPC · JPL
283659	2002 OE_{31}	—	July 18, 2002	Palomar	NEAT	WIT	1.1 km	MPC · JPL
283660	2002 PV_{7}	—	August 3, 2002	Palomar	NEAT	·	1.7 km	MPC · JPL
283661	2002 PM_{13}	—	August 6, 2002	Palomar	NEAT	·	2.6 km	MPC · JPL
283662	2002 PD_{33}	—	August 6, 2002	Palomar	NEAT	MRX	1.6 km	MPC · JPL
283663	2002 PK_{90}	—	August 11, 2002	Socorro	LINEAR	·	3.2 km	MPC · JPL
283664	2002 PW_{90}	—	August 13, 2002	Socorro	LINEAR	·	3.8 km	MPC · JPL
283665	2002 PV_{98}	—	August 14, 2002	Socorro	LINEAR	·	2.5 km	MPC · JPL
283666	2002 PK_{106}	—	August 12, 2002	Socorro	LINEAR	·	2.6 km	MPC · JPL
283667	2002 PH_{113}	—	August 13, 2002	Kitt Peak	Spacewatch	·	3.3 km	MPC · JPL
283668	2002 PD_{115}	—	August 15, 2002	Kitt Peak	Spacewatch	AGN	1.3 km	MPC · JPL
283669	2002 PD_{118}	—	August 13, 2002	Anderson Mesa	LONEOS	(32418)	3.0 km	MPC · JPL
283670	2002 PN_{137}	—	August 15, 2002	Anderson Mesa	LONEOS	·	1.8 km	MPC · JPL
283671	2002 PV_{163}	—	August 8, 2002	Palomar	S. F. Hönig	·	2.6 km	MPC · JPL
283672	2002 PG_{176}	—	August 7, 2002	Palomar	NEAT	·	2.0 km	MPC · JPL
283673	2002 PO_{177}	—	August 8, 2002	Palomar	NEAT	·	1.7 km	MPC · JPL
283674	2002 QA_{5}	—	August 16, 2002	Palomar	NEAT	DOR	4.7 km	MPC · JPL
283675	2002 QS_{21}	—	August 26, 2002	Palomar	NEAT	·	2.6 km	MPC · JPL
283676	2002 QT_{26}	—	August 29, 2002	Palomar	NEAT	·	1.9 km	MPC · JPL
283677	2002 QG_{49}	—	August 19, 2002	Palomar	S. F. Hönig	·	2.8 km	MPC · JPL
283678	2002 QA_{57}	—	August 29, 2002	Palomar	S. F. Hönig	·	1.9 km	MPC · JPL
283679	2002 QE_{64}	—	August 30, 2002	Palomar	NEAT	·	3.4 km	MPC · JPL
283680	2002 QZ_{79}	—	August 16, 2002	Palomar	NEAT	·	2.4 km	MPC · JPL
283681	2002 QB_{90}	—	August 19, 2002	Palomar	NEAT	·	2.5 km	MPC · JPL
283682	2002 QX_{103}	—	August 26, 2002	Palomar	NEAT	·	2.5 km	MPC · JPL
283683	2002 QV_{112}	—	August 27, 2002	Palomar	NEAT	·	3.6 km	MPC · JPL
283684	2002 QL_{121}	—	August 28, 2002	Palomar	NEAT	AEO	1.2 km	MPC · JPL
283685	2002 QD_{124}	—	August 16, 2002	Palomar	NEAT	·	2.1 km	MPC · JPL
283686	2002 QD_{128}	—	August 29, 2002	Palomar	NEAT	·	2.5 km	MPC · JPL
283687	2002 QG_{139}	—	August 17, 2002	Palomar	NEAT	·	2.3 km	MPC · JPL
283688	2002 QM_{146}	—	March 4, 2005	Kitt Peak	Spacewatch	HOF	3.2 km	MPC · JPL
283689	2002 RZ_{34}	—	September 4, 2002	Anderson Mesa	LONEOS	·	3.6 km	MPC · JPL
283690	2002 RS_{36}	—	September 5, 2002	Anderson Mesa	LONEOS	·	2.0 km	MPC · JPL
283691	2002 RH_{80}	—	September 5, 2002	Socorro	LINEAR	·	2.9 km	MPC · JPL
283692	2002 RJ_{109}	—	September 6, 2002	Socorro	LINEAR	·	2.9 km	MPC · JPL
283693	2002 RE_{112}	—	September 6, 2002	Socorro	LINEAR	·	2.6 km	MPC · JPL
283694	2002 RC_{116}	—	September 6, 2002	Socorro	LINEAR	·	1.3 km	MPC · JPL
283695	2002 RY_{133}	—	September 10, 2002	Palomar	NEAT	·	2.6 km	MPC · JPL
283696	2002 RR_{155}	—	September 11, 2002	Palomar	NEAT	·	2.0 km	MPC · JPL
283697	2002 RM_{183}	—	September 11, 2002	Palomar	NEAT	·	3.0 km	MPC · JPL
283698	2002 RT_{186}	—	September 12, 2002	Palomar	NEAT	GEF	1.5 km	MPC · JPL
283699	2002 RP_{222}	—	September 15, 2002	Palomar	NEAT	·	1.9 km	MPC · JPL
283700	2002 RG_{239}	—	September 8, 2002	Haleakala	R. Matson	·	4.0 km	MPC · JPL

== 283701–283800 ==
back to top

Designation			Discovery			Properties		Ref
Permanent	Provisional	Named after	Date	Site	Discoverer(s)	Category	Diam.	Ref
283701	2002 RP_{243}	—	September 4, 2002	Palomar	NEAT	GEF	1.5 km	MPC · JPL
283702	2002 RV_{243}	—	September 14, 2002	Palomar	NEAT	·	1.9 km	MPC · JPL
283703	2002 RH_{255}	—	September 15, 2002	Palomar	NEAT	·	2.1 km	MPC · JPL
283704	2002 RT_{269}	—	September 4, 2002	Palomar	NEAT	·	1.5 km	MPC · JPL
283705	2002 SX	—	September 20, 2002	Palomar	NEAT	(40134)	3.5 km	MPC · JPL
283706	2002 SA_{5}	—	September 27, 2002	Palomar	NEAT	·	2.1 km	MPC · JPL
283707	2002 SA_{10}	—	September 27, 2002	Palomar	NEAT	·	2.0 km	MPC · JPL
283708	2002 SW_{55}	—	September 30, 2002	Socorro	LINEAR	·	2.8 km	MPC · JPL
283709	2002 TJ_{17}	—	October 2, 2002	Socorro	LINEAR	·	1.2 km	MPC · JPL
283710	2002 TK_{57}	—	October 2, 2002	Socorro	LINEAR	·	3.2 km	MPC · JPL
283711	2002 TR_{98}	—	October 3, 2002	Socorro	LINEAR	AGN	1.3 km	MPC · JPL
283712	2002 TA_{104}	—	October 4, 2002	Socorro	LINEAR	·	2.9 km	MPC · JPL
283713	2002 TS_{108}	—	October 1, 2002	Haleakala	NEAT	·	4.1 km	MPC · JPL
283714	2002 TL_{143}	—	October 4, 2002	Socorro	LINEAR	·	2.4 km	MPC · JPL
283715	2002 TL_{144}	—	October 5, 2002	Socorro	LINEAR	·	4.0 km	MPC · JPL
283716	2002 TU_{148}	—	October 5, 2002	Palomar	NEAT	·	3.3 km	MPC · JPL
283717	2002 TB_{160}	—	October 5, 2002	Palomar	NEAT	·	2.4 km	MPC · JPL
283718	2002 TP_{162}	—	October 5, 2002	Palomar	NEAT	(18466)	3.9 km	MPC · JPL
283719	2002 TX_{165}	—	October 3, 2002	Palomar	NEAT	URS	5.1 km	MPC · JPL
283720	2002 TA_{170}	—	October 3, 2002	Palomar	NEAT	·	3.2 km	MPC · JPL
283721	2002 TC_{172}	—	October 4, 2002	Palomar	NEAT	·	3.2 km	MPC · JPL
283722	2002 TR_{186}	—	October 4, 2002	Socorro	LINEAR	·	3.5 km	MPC · JPL
283723	2002 TU_{189}	—	October 5, 2002	Socorro	LINEAR	·	3.0 km	MPC · JPL
283724	2002 TO_{218}	—	October 5, 2002	Socorro	LINEAR	·	2.7 km	MPC · JPL
283725	2002 TA_{226}	—	October 8, 2002	Anderson Mesa	LONEOS	·	2.3 km	MPC · JPL
283726	2002 TR_{230}	—	October 7, 2002	Palomar	NEAT	·	3.1 km	MPC · JPL
283727	2002 TM_{292}	—	October 10, 2002	Socorro	LINEAR	·	3.1 km	MPC · JPL
283728	2002 TY_{341}	—	October 5, 2002	Apache Point	SDSS	·	2.4 km	MPC · JPL
283729	2002 UX	—	October 25, 2002	Socorro	LINEAR	AMO +1km	810 m	MPC · JPL
283730	2002 VU_{2}	—	November 2, 2002	Haleakala	NEAT	MRX	1.6 km	MPC · JPL
283731	2002 VJ_{13}	—	November 4, 2002	Palomar	NEAT	·	2.3 km	MPC · JPL
283732	2002 VB_{68}	—	November 7, 2002	Kitt Peak	Spacewatch	L5	9.7 km	MPC · JPL
283733	2002 VZ_{125}	—	November 14, 2002	Palomar	NEAT	PHO	4.4 km	MPC · JPL
283734	2002 VT_{147}	—	February 19, 2004	Needville	Needville	·	3.0 km	MPC · JPL
283735	2002 WY_{6}	—	November 24, 2002	Palomar	NEAT	·	750 m	MPC · JPL
283736	2002 WO_{7}	—	November 24, 2002	Palomar	NEAT	·	3.4 km	MPC · JPL
283737	2002 WB_{9}	—	November 24, 2002	Palomar	NEAT	·	3.2 km	MPC · JPL
283738	2002 XB_{21}	—	December 2, 2002	Socorro	LINEAR	·	2.4 km	MPC · JPL
283739	2002 XO_{34}	—	December 6, 2002	Socorro	LINEAR	·	3.7 km	MPC · JPL
283740	2002 XF_{75}	—	December 11, 2002	Socorro	LINEAR	·	4.4 km	MPC · JPL
283741	2002 XH_{118}	—	December 14, 2002	Apache Point	SDSS	·	1.2 km	MPC · JPL
283742	2003 AG_{9}	—	January 4, 2003	Socorro	LINEAR	PHO	1.6 km	MPC · JPL
283743	2003 AP_{40}	—	January 7, 2003	Socorro	LINEAR	·	3.9 km	MPC · JPL
283744	2003 AR_{41}	—	January 7, 2003	Socorro	LINEAR	·	5.2 km	MPC · JPL
283745	2003 BL_{8}	—	January 26, 2003	Anderson Mesa	LONEOS	·	5.3 km	MPC · JPL
283746	2003 BJ_{16}	—	January 26, 2003	Haleakala	NEAT	·	4.6 km	MPC · JPL
283747	2003 BT_{53}	—	January 27, 2003	Anderson Mesa	LONEOS	VER	3.8 km	MPC · JPL
283748	2003 CN_{14}	—	February 3, 2003	Palomar	NEAT	·	790 m	MPC · JPL
283749	2003 CJ_{20}	—	February 9, 2003	Palomar	NEAT	·	1.0 km	MPC · JPL
283750	2003 CD_{25}	—	February 1, 2003	Palomar	NEAT	PHO	1.4 km	MPC · JPL
283751	2003 DR_{11}	—	February 25, 2003	Campo Imperatore	CINEOS	·	930 m	MPC · JPL
283752	2003 DN_{24}	—	February 22, 2003	Palomar	NEAT	·	1.2 km	MPC · JPL
283753	2003 EW_{6}	—	March 6, 2003	Anderson Mesa	LONEOS	·	1.4 km	MPC · JPL
283754	2003 EP_{30}	—	March 6, 2003	Palomar	NEAT	·	1.3 km	MPC · JPL
283755	2003 EO_{43}	—	March 8, 2003	Socorro	LINEAR	H	750 m	MPC · JPL
283756	2003 EB_{57}	—	March 9, 2003	Anderson Mesa	LONEOS	PHO	1.4 km	MPC · JPL
283757	2003 EU_{61}	—	March 8, 2003	Kitt Peak	Deep Lens Survey	NYS	1.5 km	MPC · JPL
283758	2003 FC_{22}	—	March 25, 2003	Kitt Peak	Spacewatch	MAS	720 m	MPC · JPL
283759	2003 FO_{53}	—	March 25, 2003	Palomar	NEAT	·	2.2 km	MPC · JPL
283760	2003 FS_{61}	—	March 26, 2003	Palomar	NEAT	·	1.6 km	MPC · JPL
283761	2003 FO_{73}	—	March 26, 2003	Palomar	NEAT	V	1.1 km	MPC · JPL
283762	2003 FG_{92}	—	March 29, 2003	Anderson Mesa	LONEOS	·	1.9 km	MPC · JPL
283763	2003 FO_{131}	—	March 27, 2003	Palomar	NEAT	·	1.6 km	MPC · JPL
283764	2003 GW_{8}	—	April 1, 2003	Socorro	LINEAR	·	1.7 km	MPC · JPL
283765	2003 GP_{48}	—	April 9, 2003	Palomar	NEAT	·	1.6 km	MPC · JPL
283766	2003 GR_{49}	—	April 10, 2003	Kitt Peak	Spacewatch	PHO	1.2 km	MPC · JPL
283767	2003 GB_{51}	—	April 8, 2003	Haleakala	NEAT	·	1.6 km	MPC · JPL
283768	2003 HE_{19}	—	April 26, 2003	Kitt Peak	Spacewatch	NYS	1.4 km	MPC · JPL
283769	2003 HH_{22}	—	April 27, 2003	Anderson Mesa	LONEOS	·	1.6 km	MPC · JPL
283770	2003 HN_{44}	—	April 27, 2003	Anderson Mesa	LONEOS	·	1.8 km	MPC · JPL
283771	2003 JN_{16}	—	May 9, 2003	Socorro	LINEAR	PHO	2.1 km	MPC · JPL
283772	2003 JX_{16}	—	May 9, 2003	Socorro	LINEAR	·	2.8 km	MPC · JPL
283773	2003 NE_{5}	—	July 5, 2003	Socorro	LINEAR	·	2.9 km	MPC · JPL
283774	2003 OE_{1}	—	July 22, 2003	Campo Imperatore	CINEOS	·	1.1 km	MPC · JPL
283775	2003 OX_{1}	—	July 22, 2003	Haleakala	NEAT	·	1.8 km	MPC · JPL
283776	2003 OR_{9}	—	July 25, 2003	Socorro	LINEAR	·	1.5 km	MPC · JPL
283777	2003 OB_{21}	—	July 23, 2003	Socorro	LINEAR	·	2.9 km	MPC · JPL
283778	2003 PS_{9}	—	August 1, 2003	Socorro	LINEAR	·	3.7 km	MPC · JPL
283779	2003 QA_{10}	—	August 20, 2003	Reedy Creek	J. Broughton	·	1.4 km	MPC · JPL
283780	2003 QJ_{22}	—	August 20, 2003	Palomar	NEAT	·	3.0 km	MPC · JPL
283781	2003 QZ_{28}	—	August 23, 2003	Socorro	LINEAR	·	1.7 km	MPC · JPL
283782	2003 QN_{35}	—	August 22, 2003	Socorro	LINEAR	·	1.2 km	MPC · JPL
283783	2003 QF_{59}	—	August 23, 2003	Socorro	LINEAR	·	1.8 km	MPC · JPL
283784	2003 QN_{70}	—	August 24, 2003	Socorro	LINEAR	H	690 m	MPC · JPL
283785	2003 QE_{103}	—	August 31, 2003	Kitt Peak	Spacewatch	·	1.5 km	MPC · JPL
283786 Rutebeuf	2003 QF_{104}	Rutebeuf	August 21, 2003	Saint-Sulpice	Saint-Sulpice	HIL · 3:2	8.5 km	MPC · JPL
283787	2003 QD_{105}	—	August 31, 2003	Haleakala	NEAT	·	1.6 km	MPC · JPL
283788	2003 QF_{106}	—	August 30, 2003	Haleakala	NEAT	·	1.8 km	MPC · JPL
283789	2003 QD_{107}	—	August 31, 2003	Socorro	LINEAR	·	3.4 km	MPC · JPL
283790	2003 RG_{1}	—	September 2, 2003	Socorro	LINEAR	·	1.7 km	MPC · JPL
283791	2003 RJ_{11}	—	September 13, 2003	Haleakala	NEAT	·	1.6 km	MPC · JPL
283792	2003 RY_{19}	—	September 15, 2003	Anderson Mesa	LONEOS	·	1.4 km	MPC · JPL
283793	2003 SS_{13}	—	September 16, 2003	Kitt Peak	Spacewatch	(5)	1.2 km	MPC · JPL
283794	2003 SC_{23}	—	September 16, 2003	Palomar	NEAT	·	2.0 km	MPC · JPL
283795	2003 SN_{32}	—	September 17, 2003	Haleakala	NEAT	H	830 m	MPC · JPL
283796	2003 SD_{37}	—	September 16, 2003	Palomar	NEAT	·	2.0 km	MPC · JPL
283797	2003 SU_{42}	—	September 16, 2003	Anderson Mesa	LONEOS	·	1.9 km	MPC · JPL
283798	2003 SS_{59}	—	September 17, 2003	Anderson Mesa	LONEOS	(5)	1.4 km	MPC · JPL
283799	2003 SJ_{77}	—	September 19, 2003	Kitt Peak	Spacewatch	·	3.6 km	MPC · JPL
283800	2003 SJ_{85}	—	September 16, 2003	Palomar	NEAT	JUN	1.5 km	MPC · JPL

== 283801–283900 ==
back to top

Designation			Discovery			Properties		Ref
Permanent	Provisional	Named after	Date	Site	Discoverer(s)	Category	Diam.	Ref
283801	2003 SA_{94}	—	September 18, 2003	Kitt Peak	Spacewatch	·	3.6 km	MPC · JPL
283802	2003 SX_{101}	—	September 20, 2003	Palomar	NEAT	·	4.0 km	MPC · JPL
283803	2003 SR_{106}	—	September 20, 2003	Kitt Peak	Spacewatch	·	1.4 km	MPC · JPL
283804	2003 SW_{116}	—	September 16, 2003	Palomar	NEAT	·	1.7 km	MPC · JPL
283805	2003 SE_{130}	—	September 19, 2003	Kitt Peak	Spacewatch	HNS	1.4 km	MPC · JPL
283806	2003 SM_{133}	—	September 18, 2003	Palomar	NEAT	·	2.1 km	MPC · JPL
283807	2003 SM_{137}	—	September 20, 2003	Palomar	NEAT	(5)	1.6 km	MPC · JPL
283808	2003 SN_{143}	—	September 20, 2003	Palomar	NEAT	(5)	1.6 km	MPC · JPL
283809	2003 SE_{176}	—	September 18, 2003	Palomar	NEAT	·	3.7 km	MPC · JPL
283810	2003 SU_{182}	—	September 20, 2003	Črni Vrh	Skvarč, J.	H	710 m	MPC · JPL
283811	2003 SA_{204}	—	September 22, 2003	Anderson Mesa	LONEOS	·	1.9 km	MPC · JPL
283812	2003 SQ_{208}	—	September 23, 2003	Palomar	NEAT	·	1.4 km	MPC · JPL
283813	2003 SD_{233}	—	September 25, 2003	Palomar	NEAT	·	1.3 km	MPC · JPL
283814	2003 SS_{244}	—	September 26, 2003	Socorro	LINEAR	(5)	1.2 km	MPC · JPL
283815	2003 SU_{251}	—	September 26, 2003	Socorro	LINEAR	·	1.9 km	MPC · JPL
283816	2003 SK_{266}	—	September 29, 2003	Socorro	LINEAR	·	1.4 km	MPC · JPL
283817	2003 SP_{274}	—	September 28, 2003	Kitt Peak	Spacewatch	·	1.7 km	MPC · JPL
283818	2003 SV_{297}	—	September 18, 2003	Haleakala	NEAT	THB	4.1 km	MPC · JPL
283819	2003 SE_{303}	—	September 17, 2003	Palomar	NEAT	·	1.1 km	MPC · JPL
283820	2003 SE_{309}	—	September 30, 2003	Anderson Mesa	LONEOS	·	3.4 km	MPC · JPL
283821	2003 SK_{324}	—	September 17, 2003	Kitt Peak	Spacewatch	·	2.8 km	MPC · JPL
283822	2003 SB_{340}	—	September 27, 2003	Apache Point	SDSS	·	1.9 km	MPC · JPL
283823	2003 SX_{401}	—	September 26, 2003	Apache Point	SDSS	·	2.7 km	MPC · JPL
283824	2003 TB_{5}	—	October 1, 2003	Kitt Peak	Spacewatch	·	2.1 km	MPC · JPL
283825	2003 TE_{9}	—	October 4, 2003	Kitt Peak	Spacewatch	·	2.4 km	MPC · JPL
283826	2003 TP_{12}	—	October 14, 2003	Anderson Mesa	LONEOS	·	1.3 km	MPC · JPL
283827	2003 TP_{15}	—	October 15, 2003	Anderson Mesa	LONEOS	·	1.8 km	MPC · JPL
283828	2003 TE_{28}	—	October 1, 2003	Kitt Peak	Spacewatch	·	1.7 km	MPC · JPL
283829	2003 TT_{53}	—	October 5, 2003	Kitt Peak	Spacewatch	HNS	1.3 km	MPC · JPL
283830	2003 TT_{58}	—	October 5, 2003	Kitt Peak	Spacewatch	ADE	1.8 km	MPC · JPL
283831	2003 UP_{4}	—	October 16, 2003	Socorro	LINEAR	H	950 m	MPC · JPL
283832	2003 UC_{9}	—	October 18, 2003	Socorro	LINEAR	·	2.0 km	MPC · JPL
283833	2003 US_{18}	—	October 19, 2003	Haleakala	NEAT	·	1.7 km	MPC · JPL
283834	2003 UY_{31}	—	October 16, 2003	Kitt Peak	Spacewatch	·	2.3 km	MPC · JPL
283835	2003 UT_{34}	—	October 26, 2003	Catalina	CSS	·	1.5 km	MPC · JPL
283836	2003 UY_{58}	—	October 16, 2003	Palomar	NEAT	·	1.7 km	MPC · JPL
283837	2003 UP_{59}	—	October 17, 2003	Anderson Mesa	LONEOS	·	1.6 km	MPC · JPL
283838	2003 UM_{83}	—	October 17, 2003	Anderson Mesa	LONEOS	·	1.4 km	MPC · JPL
283839	2003 UJ_{98}	—	October 19, 2003	Anderson Mesa	LONEOS	(5)	1.3 km	MPC · JPL
283840	2003 UV_{102}	—	October 20, 2003	Kitt Peak	Spacewatch	·	1.4 km	MPC · JPL
283841	2003 UW_{106}	—	October 18, 2003	Palomar	NEAT	·	5.1 km	MPC · JPL
283842	2003 UQ_{108}	—	October 19, 2003	Kitt Peak	Spacewatch	·	1.5 km	MPC · JPL
283843	2003 UH_{113}	—	October 20, 2003	Socorro	LINEAR	EUN	1.7 km	MPC · JPL
283844	2003 UH_{116}	—	October 21, 2003	Socorro	LINEAR	·	1.9 km	MPC · JPL
283845	2003 UE_{126}	—	October 20, 2003	Socorro	LINEAR	·	2.7 km	MPC · JPL
283846	2003 UO_{134}	—	October 20, 2003	Palomar	NEAT	·	2.0 km	MPC · JPL
283847	2003 UX_{136}	—	October 21, 2003	Socorro	LINEAR	(5)	1.3 km	MPC · JPL
283848	2003 UG_{146}	—	October 18, 2003	Anderson Mesa	LONEOS	·	1.1 km	MPC · JPL
283849	2003 UR_{151}	—	October 21, 2003	Socorro	LINEAR	·	2.1 km	MPC · JPL
283850	2003 UL_{181}	—	October 21, 2003	Socorro	LINEAR	·	860 m	MPC · JPL
283851	2003 UU_{212}	—	October 23, 2003	Haleakala	NEAT	·	2.0 km	MPC · JPL
283852	2003 UF_{233}	—	October 24, 2003	Kitt Peak	Spacewatch	·	2.4 km	MPC · JPL
283853	2003 UQ_{256}	—	October 25, 2003	Socorro	LINEAR	·	2.8 km	MPC · JPL
283854	2003 UX_{274}	—	October 30, 2003	Haleakala	NEAT	·	1.7 km	MPC · JPL
283855	2003 UD_{277}	—	October 30, 2003	Haleakala	NEAT	·	2.0 km	MPC · JPL
283856	2003 UW_{331}	—	October 18, 2003	Apache Point	SDSS	(5)	1.0 km	MPC · JPL
283857	2003 UP_{341}	—	October 19, 2003	Apache Point	SDSS	·	3.0 km	MPC · JPL
283858	2003 VY_{10}	—	November 15, 2003	Palomar	NEAT	·	2.3 km	MPC · JPL
283859	2003 WS_{28}	—	November 18, 2003	Kitt Peak	Spacewatch	·	3.2 km	MPC · JPL
283860	2003 WG_{38}	—	November 19, 2003	Socorro	LINEAR	·	2.1 km	MPC · JPL
283861	2003 WB_{39}	—	November 19, 2003	Kitt Peak	Spacewatch	·	1.6 km	MPC · JPL
283862	2003 WB_{73}	—	November 20, 2003	Socorro	LINEAR	·	1.8 km	MPC · JPL
283863	2003 WG_{76}	—	November 19, 2003	Kitt Peak	Spacewatch	·	2.7 km	MPC · JPL
283864	2003 WY_{82}	—	November 20, 2003	Socorro	LINEAR	(5)	1.4 km	MPC · JPL
283865	2003 WC_{98}	—	November 19, 2003	Anderson Mesa	LONEOS	·	2.5 km	MPC · JPL
283866	2003 WY_{102}	—	November 21, 2003	Socorro	LINEAR	·	2.3 km	MPC · JPL
283867	2003 WC_{104}	—	November 21, 2003	Socorro	LINEAR	·	2.9 km	MPC · JPL
283868	2003 WU_{150}	—	November 24, 2003	Anderson Mesa	LONEOS	NEM	3.1 km	MPC · JPL
283869	2003 WL_{166}	—	November 20, 2003	Socorro	LINEAR	H	950 m	MPC · JPL
283870	2003 WC_{168}	—	November 19, 2003	Palomar	NEAT	·	1.9 km	MPC · JPL
283871	2003 WB_{189}	—	November 19, 2003	Palomar	NEAT	·	2.2 km	MPC · JPL
283872	2003 XP_{5}	—	December 3, 2003	Anderson Mesa	LONEOS	H	950 m	MPC · JPL
283873	2003 XX_{23}	—	December 1, 2003	Kitt Peak	Spacewatch	·	1.9 km	MPC · JPL
283874	2003 YB	—	December 16, 2003	Anderson Mesa	LONEOS	·	3.4 km	MPC · JPL
283875	2003 YS_{9}	—	December 17, 2003	Palomar	NEAT	·	4.1 km	MPC · JPL
283876	2003 YP_{35}	—	December 19, 2003	Socorro	LINEAR	·	2.0 km	MPC · JPL
283877	2003 YV_{43}	—	December 19, 2003	Socorro	LINEAR	GAL	2.5 km	MPC · JPL
283878	2003 YB_{58}	—	December 19, 2003	Socorro	LINEAR	ADE	3.2 km	MPC · JPL
283879	2003 YZ_{113}	—	December 24, 2003	Haleakala	NEAT	·	2.8 km	MPC · JPL
283880	2003 YV_{154}	—	December 29, 2003	Socorro	LINEAR	·	5.6 km	MPC · JPL
283881	2003 YW_{157}	—	December 17, 2003	Kitt Peak	Spacewatch	·	2.8 km	MPC · JPL
283882	2003 YB_{158}	—	December 17, 2003	Palomar	NEAT	·	2.5 km	MPC · JPL
283883	2003 YM_{180}	—	December 22, 2003	Socorro	LINEAR	·	2.9 km	MPC · JPL
283884	2004 BT_{22}	—	January 17, 2004	Palomar	NEAT	·	3.0 km	MPC · JPL
283885	2004 BE_{54}	—	January 22, 2004	Socorro	LINEAR	·	3.6 km	MPC · JPL
283886	2004 BN_{54}	—	January 22, 2004	Socorro	LINEAR	·	3.0 km	MPC · JPL
283887	2004 BZ_{68}	—	January 27, 2004	Socorro	LINEAR	·	2.2 km	MPC · JPL
283888	2004 BY_{70}	—	January 22, 2004	Socorro	LINEAR	DOR	3.8 km	MPC · JPL
283889	2004 BL_{89}	—	January 23, 2004	Socorro	LINEAR	·	1.3 km	MPC · JPL
283890	2004 BY_{110}	—	January 29, 2004	Socorro	LINEAR	GAL	2.1 km	MPC · JPL
283891	2004 BF_{130}	—	January 16, 2004	Kitt Peak	Spacewatch	KOR	1.3 km	MPC · JPL
283892	2004 BY_{153}	—	January 27, 2004	Kitt Peak	Spacewatch	·	3.2 km	MPC · JPL
283893	2004 CB_{6}	—	February 10, 2004	Catalina	CSS	·	2.8 km	MPC · JPL
283894	2004 CL_{8}	—	February 11, 2004	Anderson Mesa	LONEOS	·	2.6 km	MPC · JPL
283895	2004 CD_{20}	—	February 11, 2004	Kitt Peak	Spacewatch	·	3.7 km	MPC · JPL
283896	2004 CL_{20}	—	February 11, 2004	Kitt Peak	Spacewatch	·	7.9 km	MPC · JPL
283897	2004 CD_{56}	—	February 14, 2004	Haleakala	NEAT	TIR	2.4 km	MPC · JPL
283898	2004 CZ_{63}	—	February 13, 2004	Palomar	NEAT	TIR	3.8 km	MPC · JPL
283899	2004 CU_{98}	—	February 14, 2004	Catalina	CSS	TIR	4.2 km	MPC · JPL
283900	2004 DQ_{15}	—	February 17, 2004	Kitt Peak	Spacewatch	·	4.9 km	MPC · JPL

== 283901–284000 ==
back to top

Designation			Discovery			Properties		Ref
Permanent	Provisional	Named after	Date	Site	Discoverer(s)	Category	Diam.	Ref
283901	2004 DO_{28}	—	February 17, 2004	Kitt Peak	Spacewatch	·	3.3 km	MPC · JPL
283902	2004 DP_{28}	—	February 17, 2004	Kitt Peak	Spacewatch	·	3.4 km	MPC · JPL
283903	2004 DT_{43}	—	February 23, 2004	Socorro	LINEAR	·	840 m	MPC · JPL
283904	2004 DX_{43}	—	February 23, 2004	Socorro	LINEAR	·	870 m	MPC · JPL
283905	2004 EB_{42}	—	March 15, 2004	Catalina	CSS	NYS	1.4 km	MPC · JPL
283906	2004 EH_{45}	—	March 15, 2004	Kitt Peak	Spacewatch	·	830 m	MPC · JPL
283907	2004 ES_{93}	—	March 15, 2004	Socorro	LINEAR	·	580 m	MPC · JPL
283908	2004 FY_{8}	—	March 16, 2004	Socorro	LINEAR	LIX	5.1 km	MPC · JPL
283909	2004 FM_{13}	—	March 16, 2004	Kitt Peak	Spacewatch	EOS	2.2 km	MPC · JPL
283910	2004 FK_{23}	—	March 17, 2004	Kitt Peak	Spacewatch	·	700 m	MPC · JPL
283911	2004 FE_{38}	—	March 17, 2004	Socorro	LINEAR	·	880 m	MPC · JPL
283912	2004 FW_{111}	—	March 26, 2004	Socorro	LINEAR	LIX	6.6 km	MPC · JPL
283913	2004 FX_{111}	—	March 26, 2004	Kitt Peak	Spacewatch	EOS	2.6 km	MPC · JPL
283914	2004 FQ_{121}	—	March 23, 2004	Socorro	LINEAR	·	960 m	MPC · JPL
283915	2004 FG_{124}	—	March 27, 2004	Socorro	LINEAR	·	2.9 km	MPC · JPL
283916	2004 FB_{125}	—	March 27, 2004	Socorro	LINEAR	·	800 m	MPC · JPL
283917	2004 FF_{143}	—	March 28, 2004	Kitt Peak	Spacewatch	·	3.0 km	MPC · JPL
283918	2004 GL_{31}	—	April 15, 2004	Anderson Mesa	LONEOS	·	980 m	MPC · JPL
283919	2004 HU_{12}	—	April 16, 2004	Kitt Peak	Spacewatch	·	880 m	MPC · JPL
283920	2004 HL_{25}	—	April 19, 2004	Socorro	LINEAR	MAS	840 m	MPC · JPL
283921	2004 HH_{53}	—	April 25, 2004	Catalina	CSS	·	3.7 km	MPC · JPL
283922	2004 HX_{60}	—	April 23, 2004	Socorro	LINEAR	·	1.1 km	MPC · JPL
283923	2004 JH_{26}	—	May 15, 2004	Socorro	LINEAR	·	1.1 km	MPC · JPL
283924	2004 KA_{11}	—	May 19, 2004	Kitt Peak	Spacewatch	·	840 m	MPC · JPL
283925	2004 LJ_{12}	—	June 9, 2004	Kitt Peak	Spacewatch	V	890 m	MPC · JPL
283926	2004 NT_{8}	—	July 14, 2004	Reedy Creek	J. Broughton	·	1.0 km	MPC · JPL
283927	2004 NW_{14}	—	July 11, 2004	Socorro	LINEAR	·	990 m	MPC · JPL
283928	2004 OZ_{6}	—	July 16, 2004	Socorro	LINEAR	·	920 m	MPC · JPL
283929	2004 PA_{2}	—	August 6, 2004	Reedy Creek	J. Broughton	·	1.2 km	MPC · JPL
283930	2004 PM_{7}	—	August 6, 2004	Palomar	NEAT	NYS	950 m	MPC · JPL
283931	2004 PT_{17}	—	August 8, 2004	Socorro	LINEAR	·	1.5 km	MPC · JPL
283932	2004 PS_{18}	—	August 8, 2004	Anderson Mesa	LONEOS	·	1.4 km	MPC · JPL
283933	2004 PS_{30}	—	August 8, 2004	Socorro	LINEAR	·	1.1 km	MPC · JPL
283934	2004 PX_{30}	—	August 8, 2004	Socorro	LINEAR	·	880 m	MPC · JPL
283935	2004 PH_{31}	—	August 8, 2004	Socorro	LINEAR	·	1.1 km	MPC · JPL
283936	2004 PG_{34}	—	August 8, 2004	Anderson Mesa	LONEOS	·	910 m	MPC · JPL
283937	2004 PY_{35}	—	August 8, 2004	Anderson Mesa	LONEOS	·	1.4 km	MPC · JPL
283938	2004 PR_{40}	—	August 9, 2004	Socorro	LINEAR	V	920 m	MPC · JPL
283939	2004 PJ_{48}	—	August 8, 2004	Socorro	LINEAR	·	1.4 km	MPC · JPL
283940	2004 PU_{55}	—	August 8, 2004	Anderson Mesa	LONEOS	·	1.4 km	MPC · JPL
283941	2004 PJ_{59}	—	August 9, 2004	Anderson Mesa	LONEOS	·	1.0 km	MPC · JPL
283942	2004 PD_{61}	—	August 9, 2004	Socorro	LINEAR	V	890 m	MPC · JPL
283943	2004 PL_{61}	—	August 9, 2004	Socorro	LINEAR	·	1.2 km	MPC · JPL
283944	2004 PS_{62}	—	August 10, 2004	Socorro	LINEAR	·	1.2 km	MPC · JPL
283945	2004 PB_{63}	—	August 10, 2004	Socorro	LINEAR	·	950 m	MPC · JPL
283946	2004 PV_{64}	—	August 10, 2004	Socorro	LINEAR	·	1.1 km	MPC · JPL
283947	2004 PF_{65}	—	August 10, 2004	Socorro	LINEAR	·	2.1 km	MPC · JPL
283948	2004 PU_{85}	—	August 10, 2004	Socorro	LINEAR	·	1.2 km	MPC · JPL
283949	2004 PG_{94}	—	August 10, 2004	Socorro	LINEAR	·	990 m	MPC · JPL
283950	2004 PL_{103}	—	August 12, 2004	Socorro	LINEAR	·	1.9 km	MPC · JPL
283951	2004 PY_{112}	—	August 13, 2004	Palomar	NEAT	·	950 m	MPC · JPL
283952	2004 QH_{1}	—	August 19, 2004	Socorro	LINEAR	·	2.2 km	MPC · JPL
283953	2004 QT_{3}	—	August 21, 2004	Catalina	CSS	·	760 m	MPC · JPL
283954	2004 QS_{7}	—	August 22, 2004	Bergisch Gladbach	W. Bickel	NYS	1.2 km	MPC · JPL
283955	2004 QW_{19}	—	August 21, 2004	Goodricke-Pigott	Goodricke-Pigott	·	1.2 km	MPC · JPL
283956	2004 QH_{24}	—	August 27, 2004	Socorro	LINEAR	PHO	2.1 km	MPC · JPL
283957	2004 RF	—	September 1, 2004	Great Shefford	Birtwhistle, P.	V	870 m	MPC · JPL
283958	2004 RX	—	September 4, 2004	Needville	D. Borgman, J. Dellinger	H	440 m	MPC · JPL
283959	2004 RZ_{12}	—	September 4, 2004	Palomar	NEAT	·	1.2 km	MPC · JPL
283960	2004 RJ_{13}	—	September 4, 2004	Palomar	NEAT	·	1.3 km	MPC · JPL
283961	2004 RB_{19}	—	September 7, 2004	Kitt Peak	Spacewatch	·	920 m	MPC · JPL
283962	2004 RD_{21}	—	September 7, 2004	Kitt Peak	Spacewatch	·	950 m	MPC · JPL
283963	2004 RO_{27}	—	September 6, 2004	Siding Spring	SSS	·	910 m	MPC · JPL
283964	2004 RA_{47}	—	September 8, 2004	Socorro	LINEAR	NYS	1.1 km	MPC · JPL
283965	2004 RW_{49}	—	September 8, 2004	Socorro	LINEAR	MAS	860 m	MPC · JPL
283966	2004 RQ_{55}	—	September 8, 2004	Socorro	LINEAR	·	1.3 km	MPC · JPL
283967	2004 RG_{58}	—	September 8, 2004	Socorro	LINEAR	·	1.4 km	MPC · JPL
283968	2004 RV_{65}	—	September 8, 2004	Socorro	LINEAR	·	1.3 km	MPC · JPL
283969	2004 RG_{66}	—	September 8, 2004	Socorro	LINEAR	MAS ·	840 m	MPC · JPL
283970	2004 RN_{83}	—	September 9, 2004	Socorro	LINEAR	NYS	1.0 km	MPC · JPL
283971	2004 RZ_{97}	—	September 8, 2004	Socorro	LINEAR	·	1.4 km	MPC · JPL
283972	2004 RP_{101}	—	September 8, 2004	Socorro	LINEAR	·	1.4 km	MPC · JPL
283973	2004 RW_{109}	—	September 11, 2004	Socorro	LINEAR	H	750 m	MPC · JPL
283974	2004 RE_{148}	—	September 9, 2004	Socorro	LINEAR	·	1.2 km	MPC · JPL
283975	2004 RL_{155}	—	September 10, 2004	Socorro	LINEAR	·	1.5 km	MPC · JPL
283976	2004 RW_{158}	—	September 10, 2004	Socorro	LINEAR	·	1.1 km	MPC · JPL
283977	2004 RS_{161}	—	September 11, 2004	Kitt Peak	Spacewatch	·	1.3 km	MPC · JPL
283978	2004 RQ_{169}	—	September 8, 2004	Socorro	LINEAR	V	760 m	MPC · JPL
283979	2004 RN_{170}	—	September 8, 2004	Apache Point	Apache Point	·	1.2 km	MPC · JPL
283980	2004 RN_{172}	—	September 9, 2004	Kitt Peak	Spacewatch	V	910 m	MPC · JPL
283981	2004 RZ_{181}	—	September 10, 2004	Socorro	LINEAR	·	1.6 km	MPC · JPL
283982	2004 RO_{184}	—	September 10, 2004	Socorro	LINEAR	V	840 m	MPC · JPL
283983	2004 RC_{189}	—	September 10, 2004	Socorro	LINEAR	·	1.4 km	MPC · JPL
283984	2004 RB_{192}	—	September 10, 2004	Socorro	LINEAR	·	1.8 km	MPC · JPL
283985	2004 RS_{222}	—	September 3, 2004	Palomar	NEAT	PHO	1.6 km	MPC · JPL
283986	2004 RJ_{224}	—	September 8, 2004	Palomar	NEAT	·	940 m	MPC · JPL
283987	2004 RK_{237}	—	September 10, 2004	Kitt Peak	Spacewatch	·	940 m	MPC · JPL
283988	2004 RY_{310}	—	September 13, 2004	Palomar	NEAT	MAS	950 m	MPC · JPL
283989	2004 RR_{323}	—	September 13, 2004	Socorro	LINEAR	·	3.0 km	MPC · JPL
283990 Randallrosenfeld	2004 SG_{2}	Randallrosenfeld	September 16, 2004	Vail-Jarnac	Glinos, T., Levy, W.	MAS	800 m	MPC · JPL
283991	2004 SL_{30}	—	September 17, 2004	Socorro	LINEAR	·	1.5 km	MPC · JPL
283992	2004 SS_{31}	—	September 17, 2004	Socorro	LINEAR	3:2 · SHU	6.3 km	MPC · JPL
283993	2004 SG_{44}	—	September 18, 2004	Socorro	LINEAR	·	1.2 km	MPC · JPL
283994	2004 TT_{33}	—	October 4, 2004	Kitt Peak	Spacewatch	NYS	1.4 km	MPC · JPL
283995	2004 TC_{34}	—	October 4, 2004	Kitt Peak	Spacewatch	NYS	1.3 km	MPC · JPL
283996	2004 TJ_{46}	—	October 4, 2004	Kitt Peak	Spacewatch	NYS	1.4 km	MPC · JPL
283997	2004 TM_{46}	—	October 4, 2004	Kitt Peak	Spacewatch	·	2.1 km	MPC · JPL
283998	2004 TP_{49}	—	October 4, 2004	Kitt Peak	Spacewatch	MAS	860 m	MPC · JPL
283999	2004 TY_{67}	—	October 5, 2004	Anderson Mesa	LONEOS	·	1.8 km	MPC · JPL
284000	2004 TR_{95}	—	October 5, 2004	Kitt Peak	Spacewatch	MAS	760 m	MPC · JPL

back to top

== See also ==
- Meanings of minor-planet names: 283001–284000
