= Morlock (disambiguation) =

Morlocks are a fictional species in the H. G. Wells novel The Time Machine.

Morlock may also refer to:

== Fictional characters ==
- Morlocks, an alien species in the Known Space fictional universe of Larry Niven, named after H. G. Wells' Morlocks
- Morlocks (comics), a group of Marvel Comics comic book characters
- The villains in Power Rangers: Mystic Force, sometimes referred to as "Morlocks"
- The human agents of the forces of Hell on Earth in the short-lived science fiction television series G vs E
- Morlock Ambrosius, a recurring character in James Enge's Morlock the Maker series

== Music ==
- The Morlocks (American band), an American garage band
- Morlocks (Swedish band), a Swedish industrial rock band

== People ==
- Jocelyn Morlock (1969-2023), Canadian composer
- Max Morlock (1925–1994), German footballer
- Jeremy Morlock, US Army soldier, member of the FOB Ramrod "Kill Team" that murdered three Afghan civilians in early 2010

== See also ==
- Morlachs, an old ethnic designation in Dalmatia
- Merlock (disambiguation)
- Morelock, a surname
