= Infernal Devices =

Infernal Devices may refer to:

- Infernal Devices (Jeter novel), a 1987 novel by K. W. Jeter
- Infernal Devices (Reeve novel), a novel by Philip Reeve
- The Infernal Devices, a series of novels by Cassandra Clare

== See also ==
- Infernal machine (disambiguation)
