= List of fictional humanoid species in literature =

This is a list of fictional humanoid species in literature, and is subsidiary to the lists of humanoids. It is a collection of various notable humanoid species that are featured in text literature, including novels, short stories, and poems, but not originating in comics or other sequential art.

Species	Author	Work	Notes
Abh	Hiroyuki Morioka	Crest of the Stars, Banner of the Stars series	The Abh had been created with blue hair and a spatial-sensor organ on their forehead. The spatial-sensor organ is a compact visual organ with roughly 100 million receptors. It enables them to receive information via light from a headpiece known as an alpha. Unique to the Abh is the navigational lobe that serves to process information from the spatial-sensor organ. Their body has been modified to accommodate both high gravitational force and weightlessness. Their frame and circulatory system have also been adjusted to function under such conditions.
Anophelii	China Miéville	Bas-Lag	Mosquito-like beings (singular anophelius). The females look like scrawny human women, with huge paddle-like wings with which they fly after their prey. From their mouths they can extend a bony proboscis, which they stab into their prey to suck their blood until they are husks. Female Anophelii are vicious, bloodthirsty and very dangerous except immediately after feeding, when they demonstrate an intelligence superior to that of the (already notably intelligent) male sex. The males are short, stocky men that look no different from human men, aside from their sphincter-like mouths. For a brief period, anophelii ruled a large empire called The Malarial Queendom, which collapsed when its expansion could no longer keep up with the anophelii's need for blood. Due to the potential danger of a second bloody queendom, all anophelii were quarantined to a single island.
Avian Americans	James Patterson	Maximum Ride series	
Blemmyes	Pliny	Naturalis historia	Tribe which became fictionalized as a race of creatures believed to be acephalous (headless) monsters who had eyes and mouths on their chest. Pliny the Elder writes of them that Blemmyes traduntur capita abesse, ore et oculis pectore adfixis ("It is said that the Blemmyes have no heads, and that their mouth and eyes are put in their chests"). The Blemmyes were said to live in Africa, in Nubia, Kush, or Ethiopia, generally south of Egypt.
Borrowers	Mary Norton	The Borrowers series	Tiny people who live secretly in the walls and floors of houses and live off "borrowing" food and items from humans.
Brobdingnagians	Jonathan Swift	Gulliver's Travels	
Cactacae	China Miéville	Bas-Lag	Humanoid cacti. The Cactacae are enormous plant people, often towering over human beings. Although their young grow out of the ground, they nurse them as mammals do. Cactacae have sap for blood. They are known for their strength, and are often employed as laborers and bodyguards. Cactacae bodies are fibrous, with wooden bones, making them notoriously difficult to kill or wound with normal weapons; bullets pass nigh-harmlessly through them.
Cray	China Miéville	Bas-Lag	An aquatic race who look like humans from the waist up (with the exception of protruding gills behind the ears) and rock lobsters from the waist down. They use domesticated squids to hunt and live in underwater cities.
Daeva	AssertiveRoland and others	SCP Foundation	The daevas, or Homo sanguinus, is an extinct human cousin species who lived in matriarchal clan-based societies and regularly practiced human sacrifice, slavery, and thaumaturgy. Before the Common Era, the daevas founded the Daevite Empire that covered most of Eurasia, and remains a threat to humanity despite having long since fallen. Daevite history is inconsistent due to supernatural artifacts remaining that have changed the Daevite Empire's course of history through retrocausality, a process the SCP Foundation works to prevent. Inspired from the daevas of Zoroastrianism.
Death bringers	Adam Blade	Beast Quest	Death bringers resemble bloated humanoids with four long tentacles. In Series Four of Beast Quest, The Amulet of Avantia, Nixa the Death Bringer guards one of the Amulet's shards. She can assume a ghost-like form.
Dwarf	Christopher Paolini	Inheritance Cycle	The dwarves are the two races native to Alagaësia, the others being the dragons, or possibly the spirits. The dwarves went into many wars with the dragons. They dwell in the Beor Mountains. The other races, humans and Ra'zac, came from an unknown continent, while the elves and Urgals came from Alalëa.
Dwarves	J. R. R. Tolkien	legendarium	
Eloi	H. G. Wells	The Time Machine	
Elves	J. R. R. Tolkien	legendarium	
Frankenstein's Monster	Mary Shelley	Frankenstein	Created by Dr. Frankenstein, the Monster was stitched together from human flesh and organs originating from multiple sources. It is suggested that he retains some traits and muscle memory from the humans he was composed of. He is exceptionally large and strong, and can easily survive on food that is difficult to digest for humans.
Gallivespians	Philip Pullman	His Dark Materials	Diminutive humanoids no taller than the width of a human's hand, who had spurs on their heels that could deliver poison to a target. They lived for an average of ten human years, and were a natural species alongside humans on Earth in their native universe.
Garuda	China Miéville	Bas-Lag	The garuda are nomadic humanoid birds of prey. Most hail from the Cymek desert, where they live in tribes. They are hunters with a fierce sense of individualism. They resemble winged humans with avian heads and feet; their society is completely communist, with individual possessions seen as reducing the individual's freedom. A small ghetto of garuda live in New Crobuzon, and a few are described as living near the Cacotopic Stain in Iron Council. Garudan law is based around the principle of freedom of choice; all their crimes are forms of "choice-theft", denying another being the right to choose their own fate. Their name is derived from the Garuda of Hindu folklore.
Grindylow	China Miéville	Bas-Lag	A race of very powerful, mysterious, and sadistic fish-people (something between eels and viperfish). Capable of survival in salt and fresh water, as well as in the air, they can communicate telepathically with a variety of aquatic species including whales and Cray. Their name comes from a creature of English nursery stories. Mieville's Grindylow bear a similarity to the Deep Ones of the Cthulhu Mythos. Grindylow use powerful shamanistic magic, the use of which can deform human users.
Goblins	J. K. Rowling	Harry Potter	
Hobbits/Halflings	J. R. R. Tolkien	legendarium	
Horse-men	Adam Blade	Beast Quest	Men with the lower bodies of horses. There are only two known, Tagus the Night Horse/Horse-Man and Equinus the Spirit Horse. Tagus guards Avantia, and was put under an evil, corrupting curse cast by Malvel. Tom, the protagonist, along with his companion, Elenna, free Taguus from the curse. He later helps them defeat Trillion the Three-Headed Lion, and he is later captured by Torgor the Minotaur. Equinus, however, is a true evil beast sent by Malvel. Equinus can turn people evil.
Hotchi	China Miéville	Bas-Lag	The hotchi are a race of humanoid hedgehog people who ride a domesticated breed of giant rooster.
House elves	J. K. Rowling	Harry Potter	
Khepri	China Miéville	Bas-Lag	The khepri are a race of humanoid scarab beetles. Female khepri possess bodies very similar to those of human women, except that their skin is crimson in colour and they possess large scarab beetles in place of heads. They communicate with each other via movements of their "headlegs" and squirts of chemicals. The female khepri are noted artists, using a biological excretion to sculpt breathtaking works of organic art. Male khepri, on the other hand, are lobster-sized, non-sentient scarabs, without the depending humanoid body. They mate by latching onto a female's head scarab and fertilizing her. Taken from the Egyptian god of the same name.
Koloss	Brandon Sanderson	Mistborn	
Leoniders	Strugatsky brothers	Noon Universe	
Lilliputians	Jonathan Swift	Gulliver's Travels	
Morlocks	H. G. Wells	The Time Machine	
Nac Mac Feegle	Terry Pratchett	Discworld	
Newts	Karel Čapek	War with the Newts	
Nomes	Terry Pratchett	The Nome Trilogy	
Oompa-Loompas	Roald Dahl	Charlie and the Chocolate Factory	
Orcs	J. R. R. Tolkien	legendarium	
Ra'zac	Christopher Paolini	Inheritance Cycle	Reptilian beings that have three stages like an insect, egg, youngster, and the adult. They have beaks and black eyes with no pupils or eyelids. Their breath can put people in a dream-like state, and they hide their bodies with black cloaks. The Ra'zac dwell in Helgrind, the Gates of Death. At the time when Eragon was living, there were only two Ra'zac left, though Galbatorix, the main antagonist, hid many Ra'zac eggs. Two of the eggs were destroyed at Helgrind. When it is 20 years, old, a Ra'zac becomes a lethrblaka, which resembles a bony, withered, Ra'zac-like dragon.
Scabmettler	China Miéville	Bas-Lag	Stocky, gray-skinned human-like beings whose blood, when shed, congeals immediately into a solid protective layer. Using a special herb which delays coagulation, the Scabmettlers are able to mold the blood into elaborate armor. They practice a unique form of martial, arena combat called mortu crutt, which emphasises pounding, hammer-like strikes, as edged weapons are nearly useless against them due to their rapid coagulation.
Sciapodes	Pliny	Naturalis historia	
Shadowhunters	Cassandra Clare	The Mortal Instruments	Also known as Nephilim, are human-angel hybrids created by the angel Raziel, who poured his blood into a sacred object, the Mortal Cup, and declared that any who drank from it would become Shadowhunters. Shadowhunters are not nephilim in the traditional sense, as they are not the offspring of an angel and human pairing.
Shades	Christopher Paolini	Inheritance Cycle	Humans that have merged with spirits and become evil. Known shades are Durza (originally Carsaib), and Varaug.
Singers	Brandon Sanderson	The Stormlight Archive	The original race of humanoids on Roshar. Singers have marbled skin, usually either black and red, or white and red, though occasionally all three colors can appear. Can change forms by forming a symbiotic relationship with a Spren, most forms have some amount of carapace, though most have very little. Changing forms can drastically alter a Singer's body shape, as well as their personality. Forms include but are not limited to, Warform (carapace armor, best for fighting), Workform (carapace on hands, best for labor), and Nimbleform (no carapace, best for dexterous work). A significant portion of the singer population are enslaved by humans, without form, and called Parshmen. Parshmen are docile and have reduced mental capacity.
Spirits	Christopher Paolini	Inheritance Cycle	Mystical beings that are summoned by magic users and others. They can use magic and take any form they desire. It is possible that they are native to Alagaësia, along with the dragons and dwarves.
Stone Charmers	Adam Blade	Beast Quest	Tall, purple humanoids that have no face, except for their large, green eyes that turn people to stone. Although they have no mouths, they can speak in beautiful, feminine voices. The only known Stone Charmer is Soltra. Soltra guards the golden breastplate in Series Two of Beast Quest, The Golden Armor.
Urgals/Kulls	Christopher Paolini	Inheritance Cycle	Resemble giants with spiraled horns. Urgals that become very tall are called Kulls. Urgals came from the same continent elves came from, Alalëa.
Vampire	China Miéville	Bas-Lag	The vampir are vampires, possessing great speed and strength, forked tongues, certain magical powers, and capable of living indefinitely. Vampirism on Bas-Lag is caused by a bacterium, and the technical term for the "disease" is photophobic haemophagy.
Vodyanoi	China Miéville	Bas-Lag	The vodyanoi are an aquatic people. They are fat and froglike, with webbed feet and toes. They are skilled in "watercraeft", water magics, able to fashion temporarily solid objects out of water. Vodyanoi ordinarily cannot survive out of water for more than a day, and do not swim in salt water. Inspired by the being of the same name in Russian folklore.
Veela	J. K. Rowling	Harry Potter	
Yahoos	Jonathan Swift	Gulliver's Travels	
