= The Chronic Argonauts =

1888 short story by H. G. Wells

- Short story by H. G. Wells
- Country: United Kingdom
- Genres: Thriller, science fiction

Publication

"The Chronic Argonauts" is an 1888 short story by the British science-fiction writer H. G. Wells. It features an inventor who builds a time machine and travels in time using it, and it pre-dates Wells's best-selling 1895 time travel novella The Time Machine by seven years.

== Writing and publication ==
"The Chronic Argonauts" was written in serial parts while Wells was ill and staying with friends in Stoke-on-Trent, from early April to early July 1888. Wells later recalled that: "at Etruria my real writing began. ... Moreover I began ... the original draft of what later became The Time Machine...".

It was published in the April, May, and June 1888 issues of the Royal College of Science student magazine The Science Schools Journal. Two digital versions of the text both show four subheadings:

- Being the Account of Dr. Nebogipfel's Sojourn in Llyddwdd
- How an Esoteric Story Became Possible
- The Esoteric Story Based on the Clergyman's Depositions: The Anachronic Man
- The Chronic Argo

"The Chronic Argonauts" was the second story to use an inventor-built machine to travel in time, a year after the publication of Enrique Gaspar y Rimbau's El anacronópete. Despite extensive biographical work on Wells over more than a century, there is no evidence to suggest that Wells saw or was influenced by the 1881 New York newspaper story "The Clock That Went Backward", in which an antique clock served as a time-travel device.

"The Chronic Argonauts" later developed into the famous final version of The Time Machine (1895), with the bulk of the re-writing and new writing being done in 1894. The finished novel has a number of points of similarity with the first short-story version of 1888.

== Plot summary ==
A third-person narrator describes the arrival of a mysterious inventor in the inward-looking Welsh town of Llyddwdd. Dr. Moses Nebogipfel takes up residence in a house neglected after the deaths of its former inhabitants. The simple rural folk become apprehensive about Nebogipfel's activities in the house and suspect him of witchcraft. Ultimately they storm the inventor's "devilish" workshop. Nebogipfel escapes with the sympathetic Reverend Elijah Ulysses Cook, in what is later revealed to be a time machine. The unnamed narrator later discovers the dazed Reverend Cook, who has been missing for three weeks. Cook then becomes a second narrator, relating in flashback the night of his disappearance, and a series of subsequent adventures in time with Nebogipfel. He reveals that Nebogipfel understands himself to be an "Anachronic Man", a man whose genius drives him to seek out a time more suited to his abilities. A 'time loop' is implied, in which Nebogipfel went back to the past and killed the previous owners of the house, thus causing it to fall into ruin and enabling him to occupy it for his present-day experiments.

== Inspiration for Nebogipfel ==
Since the 1970s there has been some discussion among scholars about a possible source of inspiration for Nebogipfel, since he is the root of the stock character of the time-travelling scientist. These suggestions were summarised by Martin T. Willis, who stated that the scholars had "reached no conclusions about the character of, or inspiration for, the Time Traveler", and added his own suggestion of the American inventor Thomas Edison.

== See also ==
- El anacronópete
