= Infernal machine =

Infernal machine may refer to:

== Weapons ==
- Hellburners or infernal machines, fireships built by Federigo Giambelli during the 1584–1585 Siege of Antwerp
- The "machine infernale" used in the 1800 plot of the rue Saint-Nicaise against Napoleon
- Infernal machine (weapon), a homemade gun used in the 1835 assassination attempt on Louis Philippe I
- Infernal machine, a 19th-century term for a naval mine

== Arts and entertainment ==
- Infernal Machine (film), 1933
- The Infernal Machine (play), a French play by Jean Cocteau
- "The Infernal Machine" (Space: 1999), a 1976 episode of the TV series Space: 1999
- "The Infernal Machine," a movement from the musical composition Phantasmata by Christopher Rouse
- Indiana Jones and the Infernal Machine, a 1999 video game by LucasArts
- Infernal Machines, a 2009 album by Darcy James Argue's Secret Society
- The Infernal Machine (2022 film), directed by Andrew Hunt and starring Guy Pearce
- The Infernal Machine (2024 book), by Steven Johnson

== See also ==
- Infernal Devices (disambiguation)
