= Morlock =

Fictional species created by H. G. Wells

- The Time Machine race
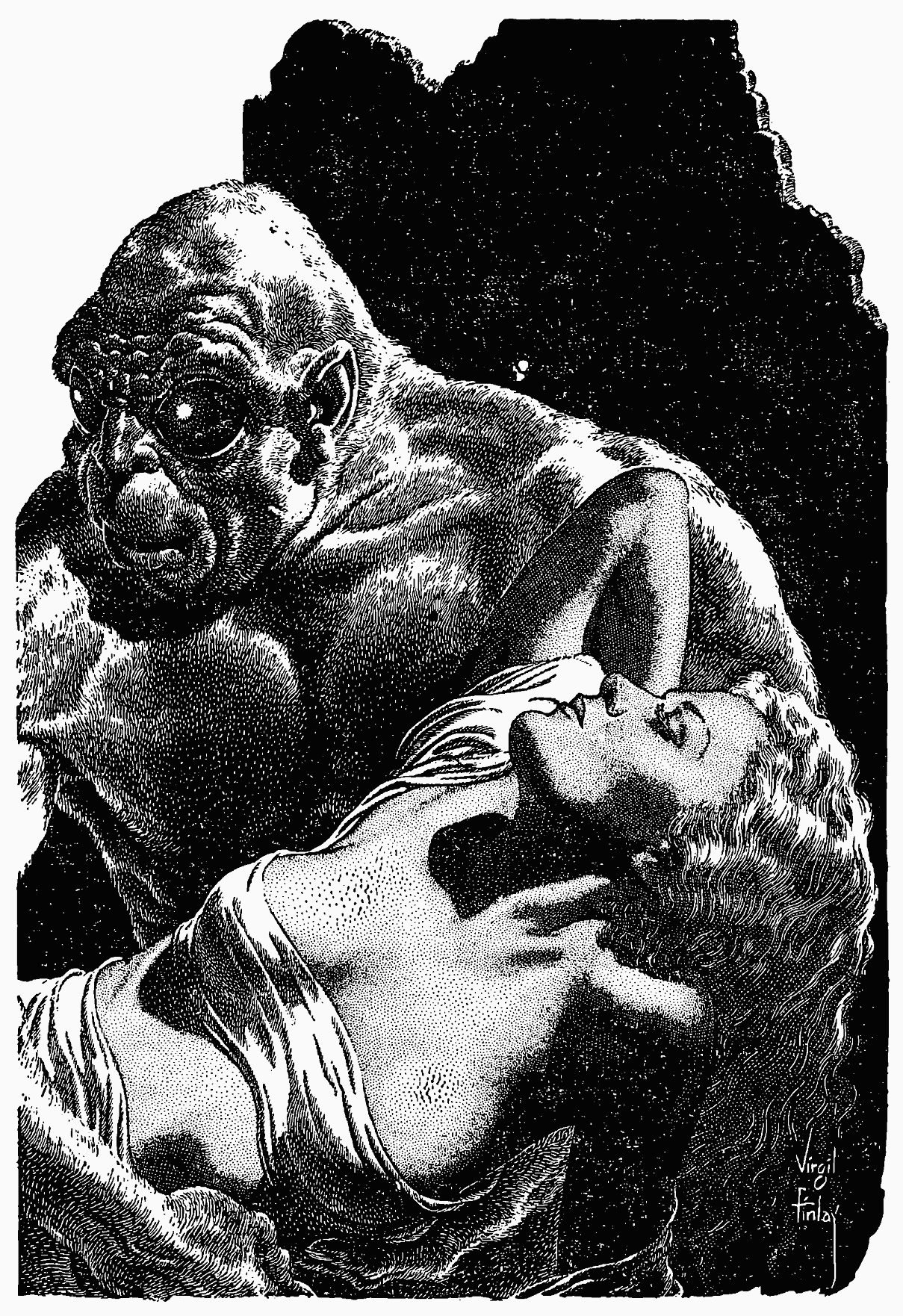
- Morlock carrying an Eloi, by Virgil Finlay (1950)
- First appearance: The Time Machine
- Created by: H. G. Wells

In-universe information
- Home world: Earth
- Type: Humanoid

Morlocks are one of the two fictional species of post-humans conceived by H. G. Wells for his 1895 novella The Time Machine (the other being the Eloi). The origin of the names is not established (with regard to Wells' inspiration or inspirations). In Wells' story, the Morlocks are the novella's main antagonists. Since their creation by Wells, Morlock characters have appeared in many other works, including sequels, films, television shows, as well as in works by other authors, many of which deviate from the original description.

== Name origin ==
With regard to the choice of the name, one writer has made a specific association between Wells' "Morlocks" and the Morlachs, a rural people of Venetian Dalmatia, frequently demonized by Westerners in the 16th–18th centuries. Alternatively, one scholar suggests it likely that the name was a combination of the word "warlock" and the god Moloch, the Canaanite god of child sacrifice, which positions Eloi as analogous to children.

== In The Time Machine ==
The Morlocks are at first a mysterious presence in the book, in so far as the protagonist initially believes the Eloi are the sole descendants of humanity. Later, the Morlocks are made the story's antagonists. They dwell underground beneath the English countryside of AD 802,701, maintaining ancient machines that they may or may not remember how to build. Their only access to the surface world is through a series of well-like structures that dot the countryside of future England.

After thousands of generations of living without sunlight, the Morlocks have come to resemble troglofauna. They are described as apelike, with dull grey-to-white skin, chinless faces, large greyish-red eyes with a capacity for reflecting light, and flaxen hair on the head and back. They are stronger than the Eloi, but smaller and weaker than the average human (the Time Traveller hurt or killed some barehanded with relative ease), but a large swarm of them could be a serious threat to a lone man, especially unarmed and/or without a light source. Unlike the Eloi, the Morlocks retain some of their human curiosity, initiative, and aggression: they are intrigued by the Time Traveller and band together to attack him when he invades their dwelling. Their language is composed of strange, unpleasant sounds, which the Time Traveller never deciphers. Their sensitivity to light usually prevents them from attacking during the day.

The relationship between the Morlocks and the Eloi is symbiotic: the Eloi are clothed, fed and possibly bred by the Morlocks, and the Morlocks consume the Eloi as a food source. Seeing this, the Time Traveller speculates that the relationship developed from a class distinction present in his own time: the Morlocks are descendants of the working class who were relegated to working and living underground so that the rich upper class could live in luxury on the surface. With time, the roles altered — the surface people grew apathetic and helpless to the point that they were no longer masters of their subterranean counterparts. However, the Morlocks must have continued to tend to the Eloi (the protagonist guesses this may at first have been out of tradition or intrinsic habit) and at some point began using them as livestock.

== In sequels and prequels ==
=== When the Sleeper Wakes ===
H. G. Wells also wrote a book called When the Sleeper Wakes (1899).{ The book centers on a man who somehow falls asleep for several centuries, and wakes in the mid-21st century to find that his investments have done so well that he owns the world. An organization called the Labour Company has rounded up most of the world's lower class, forcing them to work underground in terrible conditions for the sole benefit of the rich upper class. The implication is that these people will later degenerate to become the Morlocks. When the "Sleeper" encounters these (apparently) proto-Morlocks, he notes that they seem to be turning paler, as well as developing their own dialect of English.

=== The Time Ships ===
The Time Ships (1995), a novel by Stephen Baxter, is a canonical sequel to Wells' The Time Machine, one officially authorized by the Wells estate to mark the centenary of the original's publication. In its wide-ranging narrative, the Time Traveller attempts to return to the world of tomorrow but instead finds that his actions have changed the future: one in which the Eloi have never manifested. Instead, the Earth is a nearly barren waste that has been abandoned in favour of a 220 million kilometre-wide self-sustaining sphere around the Sun, drawing its energy directly from sunlight (since it entirely encompasses the star and receives its whole energy output), where the Morlocks (and several other offshoots of humanity) now live.

The Morlocks in this 1995 novel are peaceful, moralistic, and intelligent. The character Nebogipfel learns English in a few days and can speak it, although with some limitations due to the Morlocks' vocal apparatus, which is quite different from humans. The only resemblance these new Morlocks have to the cannibals of the first future is that of appearance and dwelling "underground". The sphere they inhabit is divided into two concentric shells, with the Morlocks living exclusively inside the nearly featureless exterior. Above them, the inner shell where the sun shines openly, an Earth-like utopia; in its many forms and at many technological levels (from similar to today, to worlds having anti-gravitational devices). They continue here in the same way as that of the Time Traveller's era, war being the obvious holdover.

The Morlocks' new civilization includes a variety of nation-groups based on thought and ideology, in which individuals move without conflict. All needs are met by the sphere itself, including reproduction where the newly born are "extruded" directly from the floor. These peaceful intelligent Morlocks seem also to have extraordinary resistance to disease and perhaps to radiations too, even when not in their homeworld, as stated by Nebogipfel when in the Paleocene. (The Time Traveller quickly became ill from unknown germs, while Nebogipfel, though injured and disabled, suffered no apparent ill effects.)

Nebogipfel is the only Morlock whose name is revealed, and remains with the Time Traveller throughout the book. Nebogipfel's name derives from the main character of H. G. Wells' first attempt at a time travel story, then called "Chronic Argonauts", and a character there named "Dr. Moses Nebogipfel". (The name Moses is also used in The Time Ships, though it is given to the younger version of himself that the Time Traveller meets on his journey.)

=== Morlock Night ===
In K. W. Jeter's novel Morlock Night, the Morlocks have stolen the Time Machine and used it to invade Victorian London. These Morlocks are always described as wearing blueish spectacles, which are presumably to protect the Morlocks' sensitive, dark-adapted eyes. The Morlocks are separated into two types, or castes, in the novel. One is the short, weak, stupid Grunt Morlocks, who are supposedly the kind that the Time Traveller encountered, and the other is the Officer Morlocks, who are taller, more intelligent, speak English, and have a high rank within the Morlock invasion force. An example of the latter type is Colonel Nalga, an antagonist later in the book.

Hence, on the whole, these Morlocks are much more formidable than those in Wells' The Time Machine — a clever, technological race with enough power to take over the entire world. They also receive support from treacherous 19th century humans, especially a dark wizard named Merdenne. It is also revealed that the Morlocks living in their native time (the 8,028th century) have stopped allowing the Eloi to roam free and now keep them in pens.

== In other printed works ==
=== In other fiction ===
Some authors have adopted the Morlocks and adapted them to their works, often completely unassociated with The Time Machine, or were named in-universe in homage to H.G. Wells' works. The Morlocks appeared in a story by Alan Moore titled Allan and the Sundered Veil, which appeared as part of the comic book collection The League of Extraordinary Gentlemen, Volume I. In the story, the Time Traveller takes some of the regular League characters into his future world, where he has made a base out of the Morlock sphinx. The party is soon attacked by Morlocks, who are fierce, simian creatures in this story. They are physically much more powerful than Wells' creatures, although they're similar to the Hunter Morlocks from the 2002 film.

Larry Niven included a version of the Morlocks in his Known Space books. They appear as a subhuman alien race living in the caves in one region of Wunderland, which is one of humanity's colonies in the Alpha Centauri system. Many of these stories are by Hal Colebatch in the shared spin-off series, "The Man Kzin Wars", especially in vols. X, XI and XII. They are also mentioned in stories in the same series by M. J. Harringtom. In Joanna Russ' short story "The Second Inquisition", The Time Machine is referenced a number of times, and the unnamed character referred to as "our guest" (who is evidently a visitor from the future) claims to be a Morlock, although she does not physically resemble Wells' Morlocks.

In the fictional universe of Warhammer 40,000, Morlocks are the elite warriors of the Iron Hands chapter of space marines and feature in several Horus Heresy novels where they act as bodyguards for their primarch Ferrus Manus. The inhabitants of the Moscow metro are sometimes sarcastically referred to as Morlocks in Dmitry Glukhovsky's Metro 2033.

=== In non-fiction ===
In Neal Stephenson's essay on modern culture vis-à-vis operating system development, In the Beginning... was the Command Line, he demonstrates similarities between the future in The Time Machine and contemporary American culture. He claims that most Americans have been exposed to a "corporate monoculture" which renders them "unwilling to make judgments and incapable of taking stands." Anyone who remains outside of this "culture" is left with powerful tools to deal with the world, and it is they, rather than the neutered Eloi, that run things.

J. R. R. Tolkien mentioned Morlocks three times in his 1939 essay On Fairy-Stories, which discusses the genre now called fantasy. The first reference occurs where Tolkien attempts to define the genre, and he suggests that the Morlocks (and Eloi) place The Time Machine more in the genre than do the Lilliputians in Gulliver's Travels. He reasoned that the Lilliputians are merely diminutive humans, whereas the Morlocks and Eloi are significantly different from us, and "live far away in an abyss of time so deep as to work an enchantment". Another reference to the creatures of The Time Machine occurs in the essay's section "Recovery, Escape, Consolation". Here it's argued that fantasy offers a legitimate means of escape from the mundane world and the "Morlockian horror of factories". Elsewhere in his essay, Tolkien warns against separating fantasy readers into superficial categories, using the Eloi and Morlocks as a dramatic illustration of the repercussions of sundering the human race.

=== Miscellaneous ===
- Die Reise mit der Zeitmaschine (1946, "The Journey with the Time Machine"), by Egon Friedell — translated by Eddy C. Bertin into English and republished as The Return of the Time Machine. At the time of its publication, this was then the only sequel to The Time Machine. It describes the Time Traveller's further visits to the future, and the Time Machine's entanglement with the past.
- The Man Who Loved Morlocks (1981), by David Lake. This novel recounts the Time Traveller's second journey. This time, he meets the Morlocks again, but is equipped with a camera and a Colt revolver. This book is notable for portraying the Morlocks in a sympathetic, and completely different light. The Time Traveller discovers, on his second trip, that the Eloi and Morlocks of the future world are all dying due to a disease introduced by him on his first trip, to which they have no immunity. Traveling further into the future, he discovers a great and noble civilization, the beautiful inhabitants of which it is eventually learned are the descendants of the few surviving Morlocks. Also, an ancient journal is discovered, which tells the story of the Time Traveller's first trip from the Morlocks' point of view, revealing that the Morlocks, rather than being hostile predators/farmers of the Eloi, were in fact the custodians of a kind of natural reserve dedicated to protecting and preserving them. The apparently hostile acts of the Morlocks are explained by showing the story from a different viewpoint.
- Time Machine Troopers (2011), by Hal Colebatch, published by Acashic. In this story, the time traveller returns to the future about 18 years beyond the time in which he first visited it, hoping to regenerate the Eloi, and taking with him Sir Robert Baden-Powell, who will later found the Boy Scout movement in England. They set out to teach the Eloi self-reliance and self-defence, but are captured by Morlocks. It turns out that the Eloi and Morlocks are both more complex than the time traveller had thought, also that Weena is still alive and leading an Eloi resistance movement. The story sets out to be an answer to Wells's pessimism, as the Time Traveller and Baden-Powell seek to teach the future world scouting and cricket. Sir Winston Churchill and H. G. Wells himself also feature as characters.

== Literary disassociation ==
A poem by J. R. R. Tolkien entitled Knocking at the Door: Lines Induced by Sensation When Waiting for an Answer at the Door of an Exalted Academic Person, has a reference to some "Morlock Mountains". Though the poem was published on February 18 of 1937 in the fiftieth issue of the Oxford Magazine, Tolkien revised the poem in 1961 or 1962 as The Mewlips, changing "Morlock" to "Merlock" to avoid an association with H.G. Wells' Morlocks.

== In film and television ==
=== The Time Machine (1960 film) ===
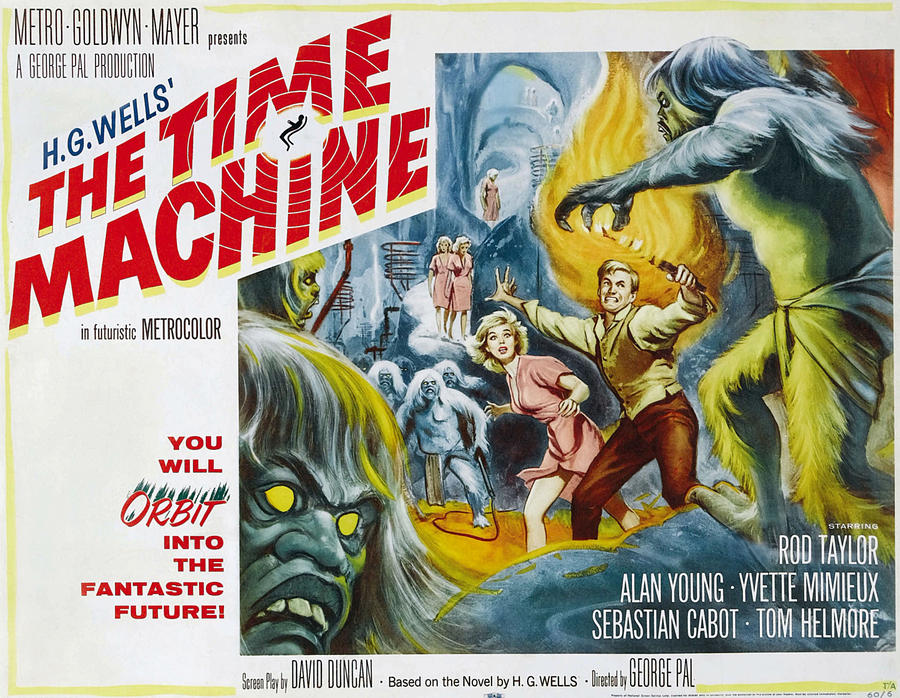
Morlocks in the poster for the 1960 film The Time Machine

The 1960 film version of The Time Machine directed by George Pal features Morlocks designed by Wah Chang. They are depicted as blue-skinned ape-like creatures with sloth-like hands and feet. Like the creatures in the novella, the Morlocks are unaccustomed to resistance and susceptible to blows. They are defeated in the end by the Eloi, who are motivated to fight back by the Time Traveller, George. The divergence between Eloi and Morlocks in this telling did not originate in a caste system, but instead originate after a nuclear war destroyed the world August 18, 1966.

The Morlocks in this film draw the Eloi to their doom through the use of air raid sirens. Sirens, which once warned their ancestors to seek shelter underground, now evoke an instinctual response in the Eloi: they go into a trance and proceed to Morlock realms, where the Morlocks finally herd them underground with whips.

=== The Time Machine (1978 film) ===
In the television film The Time Machine directed by Henning Schellerup (1928–2000) and first broadcast on US television on November 5, 1978, the protagonist Dr. Neil Perry (played by John Beck) travels with his time machine into the future to tell his company Mega Corporation, for which he developed an Antimatter bomb, about its future destructive impact on humanity. In the future, he witnessed the destruction of civilization, but also learns that nature has been revived from the wasteland and that some of the people who had previously sought refuge underground, the Eloi, have returned to the surface. The race that remained below the surface became the Morlocks, and when Perry arrives he watches as the Morlocks begin to harvest the Eloi as their food. Here, he also meets the Eloi girl Weena (played by Priscilla Barnes) who, unlike the other film adaptations, now has a brother named Ariel.

Weena leads Perry into a preserved technology museum, which also shows his bomb developed in the past for the Mega Corporation, and in a video animation he can see the damage caused by his bomb. Before Perry returns to his time, he and Ariel blow up three entrances to the Morlocks' caves with plastic explosives they found in the museum. When he travels back in time to tell his company about the dramatic effects of the bomb in the future, his superiors show disinterest. Perry travels to the future again to return to Weena and the Eloi and finds that their world is now free of the Morlocks.

=== The Time Machine (2002 film) ===
In 2002, another film based on The Time Machine was directed by Simon Wells, the great-grandson of H. G. Wells. The Morlocks in this film, as well as the Eloi, have been changed in several major ways. The Morlocks have become physically stronger and faster, and are very ape-like now, frequently running on all fours.

The movie displays three of these races:

- The Hunter Morlocks are Morlocks that hunt down and capture the Eloi. They are muscular, gorilla-like hunters. They have a powerful sense of smell used to track down the Eloi. Different actors portray the Hunter Morlocks: Richard Cetrone, Edward Conna, Chris Sayour, Jeremy Fitzgerald, Darrell Davis, Grady Holder, Bryan Friday, Clint Lilley, Mark Kubr, Jeff Podgurski, Dan McCann, Bryon Weiss, and Steve Upton.
- The Spy Morlocks are Morlocks that shoot them with blowgun darts (so as to make them detectable to the hunters). They are more slender and agile than the Hunter Morlocks, but much weaker. The Spy Morlocks shoot blowpipes at escaping Eloi, marking them with a pungent substance and making it easier for the Hunters. Different actors portray the Spy Morlocks: Joey Anaya, Jacob Chambers, Doug Jones, Dorian Kingi, and Kevin McTurk.
- The Über-Morlocks are Morlocks that command the first two races telepathically. They appear more human than the other two castes seen in the movie. Instead of having grey skin and patches of fur, the Über-Morlock (portrayed by Jeremy Irons) that appears in the film has long, flowing white hair and white skin, the general physique of a human, and clothing. His brain is so large that much of it is outside his head, trailing down his back and enveloping spine. He is telepathic and telekinetic, articulate in English speech, and eventually ends up fighting Alexander Hartdegen (the main character of this film).

As explained by the Über-Morlock when Alexander is brought to him while trying to save the Eloi Mara, the Morlocks originated from humans that sought shelter underground, after demolition operations for constructing a colony on the Moon sent some Moon fragments crashing to Earth. They remained underground for so long that they developed bodies with very little melanin in their skin and very sensitive eyes that could not tolerate sunlight for long. As a result of the past catastrophe and the resulting strain on resources, the proto-Morlocks divided themselves into several castes, two of which (the 'Hunters' and the 'Spies') could survive in the daylight. They inbred within each caste until the Morlock race became composed of genetically fine-tuned sub-races designed for specific tasks.

During the climax of the film, Alexander kills the Über-Morlock by pushing him out of the moving time machine. The rest of the Morlocks are destroyed when Alexander causes his time machine to malfunction and explode in their tunnels.

=== Time Machine: Rise of the Morlocks ===
A 2011 television movie originally named Morlocks (renamed Time Machine: Rise of the Morlocks) produced for Syfy, starring David Hewlett, and Robert Picardo. The plot sees a time machine open a portal to the future allowing Morlocks to travel back to the present and wreak havoc. These Morlocks are descended from a patient with terminal cancer whose father used the military time travel project to look for technology in the future as a cure. One of the first Morlocks to escape through the portal into the present is captured and has its DNA extracted. Paradoxically, it is treatment with this DNA that causes the patient to mutate into the first Morlock.

=== Mutant War ===
Morlocks are briefly referenced by the protagonist in reference to the zombie-like mutant antagonists of the film.

=== Television shows ===
In the serial Timelash episodes of the twenty-second season of Doctor Who, the Sixth Doctor takes H. G. Wells into the future where they encounter an underground-dwelling, reptilian species called the Morlox (a homophone of "Morlocks"). The Borad, an evil ruler, accidentally becomes half-Morlox before the episode.

In the 1978 Challenge of the Superfriends episode titled "Conquerors of the Future", the episode featured Barlocks, a variation of the Morlocks in a time period when the Super Friends are long dead who lived outside a domed city that is Earth's capital. The Barlocks have attacked it many times and are driven away by the bright lights. In addition, they aren't very good at mastering the technology they have. When the Legion of Doom arrived and encountered the Barlocks, Lex Luthor formed an alliance with their leader (voiced by Ted Cassidy) and came up with a trick to take over the domed city. Afterwards, the Legion of Doom used them in their plans to conquer the galaxy with Lex Luthor leading the Barlocks to conquer the ruling planet of Sector 13 while Black Manta leads the Barlocks to conquer the ruling planet in the Outer Galaxy Region. When Superman, Green Lantern, and Flash arrive in this time after accidentally appearing in the farther future and finding a history book that details the history of Earth, they defeat the Legion of Doom as Flash uses his super-speed to place the Barlocks back in their cave. The inhabitants of Earth's capital city sees to it that the planets the Legion of Doom and the Barlocks have conquered are liberated.

Homer Simpson mentions Morlocks in The Simpsons episode "Homer the Moe", claiming he became their king while telling a shaggy dog story.

In 2003, Peak Entertainment relaunched Monster in My Pocket with former lead villain Warlock as the hero. The new villain became Warlock's evil twin Morlock. The series was passed on by Cartoon Network and Peak's rights to Monster in My Pocket were revoked on December 22, 2004. With the series' limited distribution, it is difficult to say if the connection was more than a nominal one.

In 2006, a new incarnation of Power Rangers, titled Power Rangers: Mystic Force, includes Morlocks as the enemies of the Mystic Force Rangers. Sources from before the show's premiere described them as "zombie-like foot soldiers" and it was also implied that they live underground below the town of Briarwood (where the show takes place) and plot to rise up and destroy everything. However, it has since been revealed that the Morlocks in the show are not simply foot soldiers; they comprise the entire group of enemies of the Power Rangers that have been led by Octomus. The Morlocks in the show are entirely unlike those in The Time Machine, except that they still live underground and are villains. These Morlocks are not portrayed as a divergent species of humanity, but instead as an ancient, evil legion who were sealed underground centuries ago. The Morlocks have finally broken the seal and are planning to invade Briarwood, and later the world. The term was used exclusively in promotional material and was never mentioned in the show.

On the episode of The Big Bang Theory called "The Nerdvana Annihilation," Leonard Hofstadter and his friends chipped in to buy an original time machine prop from the 1960 film classic The Time Machine. None in the group was more excited about the purchase than Sheldon Cooper, who seemed to think he was the only one able to grasp the full possibilities of owning such a unique piece of memorabilia. His viewpoint changed drastically though, after he experienced a series of episode-ending dreams, all featuring the infamous cannibalistic Morlock species from the classic H. G. Wells book. The first dream was him travelling to the future on 28 April 802701 and being eaten alive by three Morlocks. When he wakes up, Leonard agrees to get rid of the time machine, but he hires Morlocks to do it (called Starving Morlocks). As they eat Sheldon, he wakes up again and yells for Leonard to help him.

In the 2010 episode of Futurama titled "The Late Philip J. Fry," Bender, Farnsworth, and Fry travel to the future where they meet a society of small creatures who explain that humanity has diverged into two distinct groups through evolution. Upon returning five years later, the crew discovers that the small, intelligent creatures have been overrun and destroyed by the troglodytic "Dumb-locks."

In the 2014 episode of Regular Show titled "Journey to the Bottom of the Crash Pit," Mordecai, Rigby, Muscle Man and Hi-Five Ghost travel to their cave in search for a video camera, they find it in possession of the "Carlocks" instead of Morlocks, who are the first and last of the mighty underground race and refuse to give it back, forcing them to steal it and escape in a worn-out car. The Carlocks give chase to try and get the camera back, but the four manage to escape the hole. Skips' truck then dumped dirt into the hole, killing them for good.

=== Comics ===
In Marvel Comics, the Morlock name was used for a group of mutants that live in the sewers.

In Italian Horror comic Dylan Dog Morlock is presented in episode Zed as a large humanoid monster with big fangs and three eyes.

=== Video games ===
In Bookworm Adventures 2, Morlocks are instead named Troglocks and appear as enemies of the sixth book.

The Carlocks, instead of Morlocks, also appear in the online game Fist Punch 2 as enemies.

In Deponia, Morlocks are instead named Fewlocks, but being referred to as Morlocks once and appear as enemies to the protagonists.

== See also ==
- Reaver (Firefly)
- The Cave (2005 film)
- C.H.U.D.s
- Morlachs
- Merlock (disambiguation)
- Mole people (fiction)
