= Noir (Jeter novel) =

1998 novel by K. W. Jeter

- Author: K. W. Jeter
- Language: English
- Subject: Dystopian capitalism, Film noir conventions
- Genre: Science fiction
- Set in: Pacific Fringe
- Published: 1998
- ISBN: 0-553-10483-7

Noir is a science fiction novel by American writer K. W. Jeter, published in 1998. It uses the conventions of film noir – the alienated, doomed hero, the cynical private detective, the femme fatale, universal corruption and moral breakdown – to portray a dystopian vision of capitalism run riot.

Even the monochrome visual style of film noir is a factor in Noir, as the hero has had his eyes specially treated to show the world as a black-and-white movie, altering his perception of people and objects around him so they fit into the aesthetic. The hero is a detective named McNihil who is hired by corporate executives ostensibly to investigate the death of one of their colleagues.

The book is set in the Pacific Fringe – the only remaining industrialised part of the world – in a society where free market capitalism holds absolute sway. Even the dead, including the hero's wife, can be brought back to life as slave labour if they fail to meet their financial obligations. The internet has evolved radically so that emails can be seen fluttering around the recipient and pestering for attention, while strange online sexual experiences can be had through electronic surrogates called prowlers.
