= Farewell Horizontal =

1989 science fiction novel by K. W. Jeter

- First edition cover
- Author: K. W. Jeter
- Cover artist: Bryn Barnard
- Language: English
- Genre: Science fiction
- Published: 1989
- Publisher: St. Martin's Press
- Publication place: United States
- Media type: Print (hardback & paperback)
- Pages: 237 pages
- ISBN: 0-451-16278-1
- OCLC: 20678719
- Dewey Decimal: 813/.54
- LC Class: PS3560.E85 F3 1989

Farewell Horizontal is a science fiction novel by American writer K. W. Jeter, published in 1989. It came in second for the John W. Campbell Memorial Award for Best Science Fiction Novel in 1990, and was a finalist for the Arthur C. Clarke Award in 1991. The novel deals with themes of information access, security, and reliability.

In an interview, Jeter stated that he originally intended Farewell Horizontal to be the first of a trilogy, and that he used some of the material for the planned sequel in his 1991 novel Madlands.

== Plot ==
The novel takes place inside and on the exterior of a megastructural cylindrical building called Cylinder, which one character says "violates at least a dozen laws of physics." It is not explained how this building can exist, or why it was built or by whom.

The novel begins with Ny Axxter, a "graffex" (graphic designer) on the exterior surface of the building trying to make a living as a freelancer, selling content to Ask & Receive, an information repository and apparent monopoly.

Axxter discovers a location where the exterior of the building has been blown out by an explosion and the interior rooms are full of corpses. He attributes this to bogeymen called the Dead Centers that live in the sealed off center sections of Cylinder.

Axxter gets a job working for one of the warrior tribes that inhabit the exterior of the building, redesigning their graphical branding identity. But the big reveal is hacked, apparently by the company that previously designed the tribe's graphics, embarrassing the tribe and leading to Axxter fleeing for his life.

Aided by a gas angel (a humanoid with a large gas bag growing out of its back so it can float in the atmosphere around the building) Axxter ends up on the far side of Cylinder. Axxter hatches a plan to travel through the center of the building back home, and to report on his odyssey as a form of entertainment for residents of Cylinder.

Along the way Axxter meets and is aided by a hacker who can move between bodies stashed in different parts of the building, and a Dead Center who teaches Axxter about an alternate information source to Ask & Receive.

Axxter learns that the destruction of the site that he discovered at the start of the novel was not done by the Dead Centers, but instead by a collaboration between the two most powerful warrior tribes on the building, enabled by doctored information from Ask & Receive. Axxter broadcasts this information to the entire building, leading to the collapse of the dominant power structure of Cylinder.
