= Dr. Adder =

1984 science fiction novel by K. W. Jeter

- First edition
- Author: K. W. Jeter
- Illustrator: Matt Howarth
- Cover artist: Barclay Shaw
- Language: English
- Series: Dr. Adder
- Genre: Dystopian science fiction
- Publisher: Bluejay Books
- Publication date: 1984
- Publication place: United States
- Media type: Print (Hardcover and Paperback)
- Pages: 231
- ISBN: 978-0312940997
- OCLC: 10122645
- Dewey Decimal: 813/.54 19
- LC Class: PS3560.E85 D7 1984
- Followed by: The Glass Hammer

Dr. Adder is a dark science fiction novel by American writer K. W. Jeter, set in a future where the United States has largely broken down into reluctantly cooperating enclaves run by a wide variety of strongmen and warlords, with a veneer of government control that seems largely interested in controlling technology. Dr. Adder is an artist-surgeon, who modifies sexual organs of his patients to satisfy the weirdest of perversion; he is depicted as a borderline criminal and counter-cultural figure in a future Los Angeles. The novel anticipates various cyberpunk ideas that would be established by the Sprawl trilogy written by William Gibson, as well as other works of that science fiction genre.

Dr. Adder is Jeter's debut novel. It was originally completed in 1972 and then published in 1984 by Bluejay Books—the first fictional work it ever published—with illustrations by Matt R. Howarth.

"Its impact on the field would have been enormous" according to Philip K. Dick, if the novel wasn´t delayed due to the extreme violence and graphic sex.

== Radio KCID ==
The novel also features an unconventional DJ, called Radio KCID, a science-fictional portrait of one of Jeter's friends, Philip K. Dick (the call sign is an anagram of DICK). KCID is an old man living in Rattown, a future L.A. slum; he has a small portable transmitter, which turns him into a mobile radio station. He mostly plays old records of German opera such as Alban Berg's Wozzeck, an important element of the novel, but he also broadcasts pieces of news which mainstream media do not want to broadcast.

The novel is heavily indebted to the counterculture of the 1960s. "[KCID] had some sort of process worked out, an oracle or something. It had to do with randomly generated numbers—he had a little box, a minicomputer that lit up with seven- or eight-digit figures, I think. He told me when he had enough data worked into the system he could predict any series of events connected to Adder, a few minutes before each event actually occurred..." This is a hint at I Ching, the Chinese oracular book Dick used to compose his 1962 novel The Man in the High Castle, but also a popular reading in the counter-cultural 1960s.

In Dr Adder music does not only have an aesthetic value. KCID plays Wozzeck, then he begins to interpret the opera by applying it to the situation of his listeners. "Hohl, alles hohl! That's the way it is, all right. Isn't that what you were just thinking? Ein Schlund, a gulf, an abyss, yawns beneath us and what can we do, friends? Some of us wait all our lives for something...". This rambling monologue closely resembles those of freeform radio DJs.

Radio KCID has something else in common with counter-cultural radio: "All his broadcast equipment and tapes could fit into a suitcase—he could be anywhere in the slums with it now". Such a mobile pirate radio is not science-fictional at all, since true underground radio existed in the 1960s in the form of illegal stations.

At the end of the novel KCID puts the microphone in front of the protagonist, Dr. Adder, so that he may speak to his "old fans, and everyone else, who never worshipped [him]". It might be simply considered as a moment when a speaker is interviewing a celebrity—be it transgressive, underground, unconventional or not—but it can also be seen as a moment when a listener of Radio KCID (and Dr. Adder is also one of KCID's listeners) is given the opportunity to talk to "people clustered around the radios, waiting to hear [him]". KCID probably expects that a political message will be delivered to the audience; while probably Adder's message will not be political at all, being the expression of a very personal rage.

== Reception ==
Dave Langford reviewed Dr. Adder for White Dwarf #91, and stated that "Jeter forces sympathy for Adder by pitting him against someone supposedly viler still, an immortal Moral Majority type whom Adder (now converted to a cyborg execution machine) meets in a final electronic duel which introduces an SF first—computerised pus. This one will ooze and ooze."

== Reviews ==
- Review by Dan Chow (1984) in Locus, #278 March 1984
- Review by Michael J. Tolley (1984) in Fantasy Review, July 1984
- Review by Thomas A. Easton [as by Tom Easton] (1984) in Analog Science Fiction/Science Fact, September 1984
- Review by Norman Spinrad (1984) in Isaac Asimov's Science Fiction Magazine, December 1984
- Review by Richard E. Geis (1985) in Far Frontiers
- Review by Alexander B. Nedelkovich (1985) in Science Fiction Review, Summer 1985
- Review [French] by Pierre Stone-Belflacq (1985) in Proxima [France], #8
- Review [French] by Roger Bozzetto (1986) in Fiction, #372
- Review by Mike Moir (1987) in Vector 139
- Review by Martyn Taylor (1987) in Paperback Inferno, #67
- Review by Lee Montgomerie (1987) in Interzone, #21 Autumn 1987
- Review by Kenneth L. Houghton [as by Ken Houghton] (1992) in Necrofile, Spring 1992
- Review by Stephen E. Andrews and Nick Rennison (2006) in 100 Must-Read Science Fiction Novels
- Review [French] by Grégory Drake (2015) in Bifrost, #78

== General sources ==
- Rossi, Umberto. "Acousmatic Presences: From DJs to Talk-Radio Hosts in American Fiction, Cinema, and Drama". Mosaic, 42:1, March 2009, pp. 83–98. JSTOR 44030653.
