= The Time Machine =

1895 dystopian science fiction novella by H. G. Wells

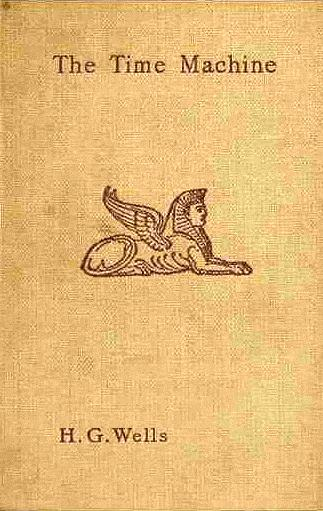
- Original book cover showing White Sphinx statue
- Author: H. G. Wells
- Cover artist: Ben Hardy
- Language: English
- Genre: Science fiction
- Publisher: William Heinemann (UK); Henry Holt (US)
- Publication date: 1895
- Publication place: United Kingdom
- Pages: 84
- Text: The Time Machine at Wikisource

The Time Machine is an 1895 dystopian science fiction novella by H. G. Wells about a Victorian scientist known as the Time Traveller who travels to the year 802,701. The work is generally credited with the popularization of the concept of time travel by using a vehicle or device to travel intentionally and selectively forward or backward through time. The term "time machine", coined by Wells, is now almost universally used to refer to such a vehicle or device.

Utilizing a frame story set in then-present Victorian England, Wells's text focuses on a recount of the otherwise anonymous Time Traveller's journey into the far future. A work of future history and speculative evolution, The Time Machine is interpreted in modern times as a commentary on the increasing inequality and class divisions of Wells's era, which he projects as giving rise to two separate human species: the fair, childlike Eloi; and the savage, simian Morlocks, distant descendants of the contemporary upper and lower classes respectively. It is believed that Wells's depiction of the Eloi as a race living in plenitude and abandon was inspired by the utopic romance novel News from Nowhere (1890), though Wells's universe in the novel is notably more savage and brutal.

In his 1931 preface to the book, Wells wrote that The Time Machine seemed "a very undergraduate performance to its now mature writer, as he looks over it once more", though he states that "the writer feels no remorse for this youthful effort". However, critics have praised the novella's handling of its thematic concerns, with Marina Warner writing that the book was the most significant contribution to understanding fragments of desire before Sigmund Freud's The Interpretation of Dreams, conveying "how close [Wells] felt to the melancholy seeker after a door that he once opened on to a luminous vision and could never find again".

In 1933, in the preface to his collected works The Scientific Romances of H.G. Wells, Wells explained: "My early, profound and lifelong admiration for [Jonathan] Swift...is particularly evident in a predisposition to make the stories reflect upon contemporary political and social discussions." He then noted, "Mr. [Israel] Zangwill in a review in 1895 complained that my first book, The Time Machine, concerned itself with 'our present discontents'. The Time Machine is indeed quite as philosophical and polemical and critical of life and so forth, as Men Like Gods written twenty-eight years later. No more and no less. I have never been able to get away from life in the mass and life in general as disinterested from life in the individual experience, in any book I have ever written". He added later on, "The Time Machine was another assault on human self-satisfaction", being "consciously grim, under the influence of Swift's tradition".

The Time Machine has been adapted into two feature films of the same name, as well as two television versions and many comic book adaptations. It has also indirectly inspired many more works of fiction in many media productions.

== History ==
Wells had considered the notion of time travel before, in a short story titled "The Chronic Argonauts" (1888). This work, published in his college newspaper, was the foundation for The Time Machine.

He frequently stated that he had thought of using some of this material in a series of articles in the Pall Mall Gazette, but in response to a request by W. E. Henley, the editor of the National Observer, he rewrote "The Chronic Argonauts" into a series of seven loosely connected and fictionalized essays which were anonymously published in the newspaper from 17 March to 23 June 1894. The series was never completed as Henley stepped down from his role as editor in National Observer. With his encouragement, Wells continued to work on the story, and at the end of the year, when Henley was given the position as editor of Heinemann's periodical The New Review, he arranged for the story to be published there in serialized form in the January to May 1895 editions instead, for which Wells was paid £100 (equal to about £11,000 today). Henry Holt and Company published the first book edition (possibly prepared from a different manuscript) on 7 May 1895; Heinemann published a British edition on 29 May. These two editions are different textually and are commonly referred to as the "Holt text" and "Heinemann text", respectively. Nearly all modern reprints reproduce the Heinemann text.

The story reflects Wells's own socialist political views, his view on life and abundance, and the contemporary angst about industrial relations. It is also influenced by Ray Lankester's theories about social degeneration and shares many elements with Edward Bulwer-Lytton's novel Vril, the Power of the Coming Race (1871). It is also thought that Wells's Eloi race shares many features with the works of other English socialists, most notably William Morris and his work News from Nowhere (1890), in which money is depicted as irrelevant and work is undertaken merely as a form of pleasure. Other science fiction works of the period, including Edward Bellamy's novel Looking Backward: 2000–1887 (1888) and the later film Metropolis (1927), dealt with similar themes. In his later reassessment of the book, published as the 1931 preface to The Time Machine, Wells wrote that the text has "lasted as long as the diamond-framed safety bicycle, which came in at about the date of its first publication", and is "assured it will outlive him", attesting to the power of the book.

Based on Wells's personal experiences and childhood, the working class spent a large portion of their time literally underground. His own family would spend most of their time in a dark basement kitchen when not being occupied in their father's shop. Later, his own mother would work as a housekeeper in a house with tunnels below, where the staff and servants lived in underground quarters. A medical journal published in 1905 would focus on these living quarters for servants in poorly ventilated dark basements. In his early teens, Wells became a draper's apprentice, having to work in a basement for hours on end.

This work is an early example of the Dying Earth subgenre. The portion of the novella that sees the Time Traveller in a distant future where the sun is huge and red also places The Time Machine within the realm of eschatology; that is, the study of the end times, the end of the world, and the ultimate destiny of humankind.

Holt, Rinehart & Winston re-published the book in 2000, paired with The War of the Worlds, and commissioned Michael Koelsch to illustrate a new cover art.

== Plot ==
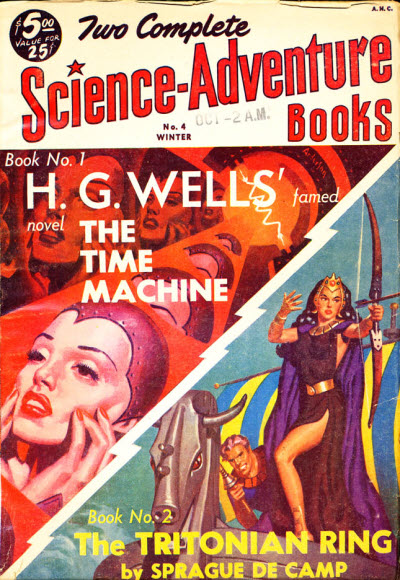
The Time Machine was reprinted in Two Complete Science-Adventure Books in 1951.

In 1895, a Victorian Englishman, identified only as the Time Traveller, tells his weekly dinner guests that he has an experimental verification of a machine that can travel through time. He shows them a small model, and they watch it disappear. He claims to have a full-scale machine nearly finished in his laboratory, in which a person could travel through time. At dinner the following week, a weary, bedraggled Traveller recounts to his guests what he experienced on his journey to the future.

In the new narrative, the Time Traveller goes into the future, observing things moving in quick motion around him. His house disappears and turns into a lush garden. The Traveller stops in A.D. 802,701, and meets the Eloi, a society of small, childlike humanoids. They live in small communities within large and futuristic yet deteriorating buildings and adhere to a fruit-based diet. Efforts to communicate are hampered by their lacking curiosity or discipline. The Eloi appear happy and carefree but fear the dark, particularly moonless nights, and also the empty wells dotting the landscape. Contagious diseases, weeds, and fungi have been eliminated alongside apparently all birds and land animals. Most of human society and engineering have disappeared, replaced by a culture without possessions, family structures, or economy, leading the Traveller to conclude that communism has been achieved at last. He also theorizes that intelligence springs from necessity; with no real challenges facing the Eloi, they have devolved into weak and naïve creatures with no understanding of the world around them.

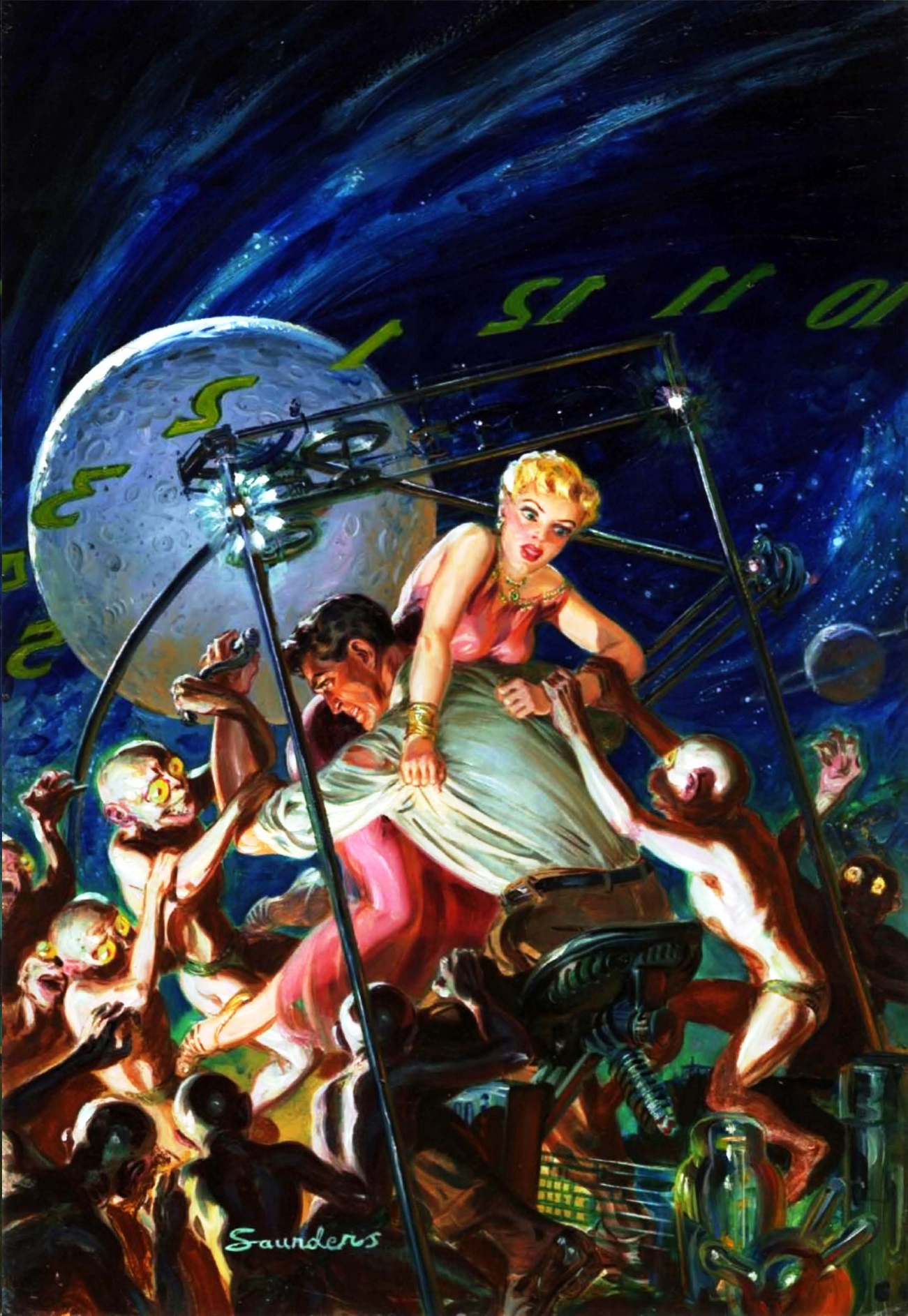
Composite cover illustration for The Time Machine by Norman Saunders in Famous Fantastic Mysteries, August 1950

Returning to his arrival site, the Traveller finds his time machine missing. Having removed the levers, he is confident it has not travelled through time. Later, he encounters the Morlocks, ape-like troglodytes who live in darkness underground and surface only at night. Deducing that they took his time machine, he explores one well that leads to the Morlocks' subterranean dwellings and discovers them operating the machinery that maintains Eloi's above-ground paradise. He realizes the Morlocks hunt the Eloi at night as food. The Traveller speculates that the human race diverged into two species: the favoured aristocracy has become the Eloi, and the servant class become the Morlocks.

Meanwhile, he rescues Eloi Weena from drowning, as the other Eloi are apathetic to her plight. The Traveller takes Weena with him on an expedition to "The Palace of Green Porcelain", a distant structure that is a derelict museum. Here, the Traveller finds fresh matches and fashions a crude weapon against Morlocks, whom he must fight to recover his machine. He plans to take Weena back to his own time to save her from the future world's horrors. Morlocks attack while they are resting in a forest, and Weena faints. The Traveller escapes when a small fire he left behind them to repel the Morlocks turns into a forest fire; Weena and the Morlocks are lost in the blaze.

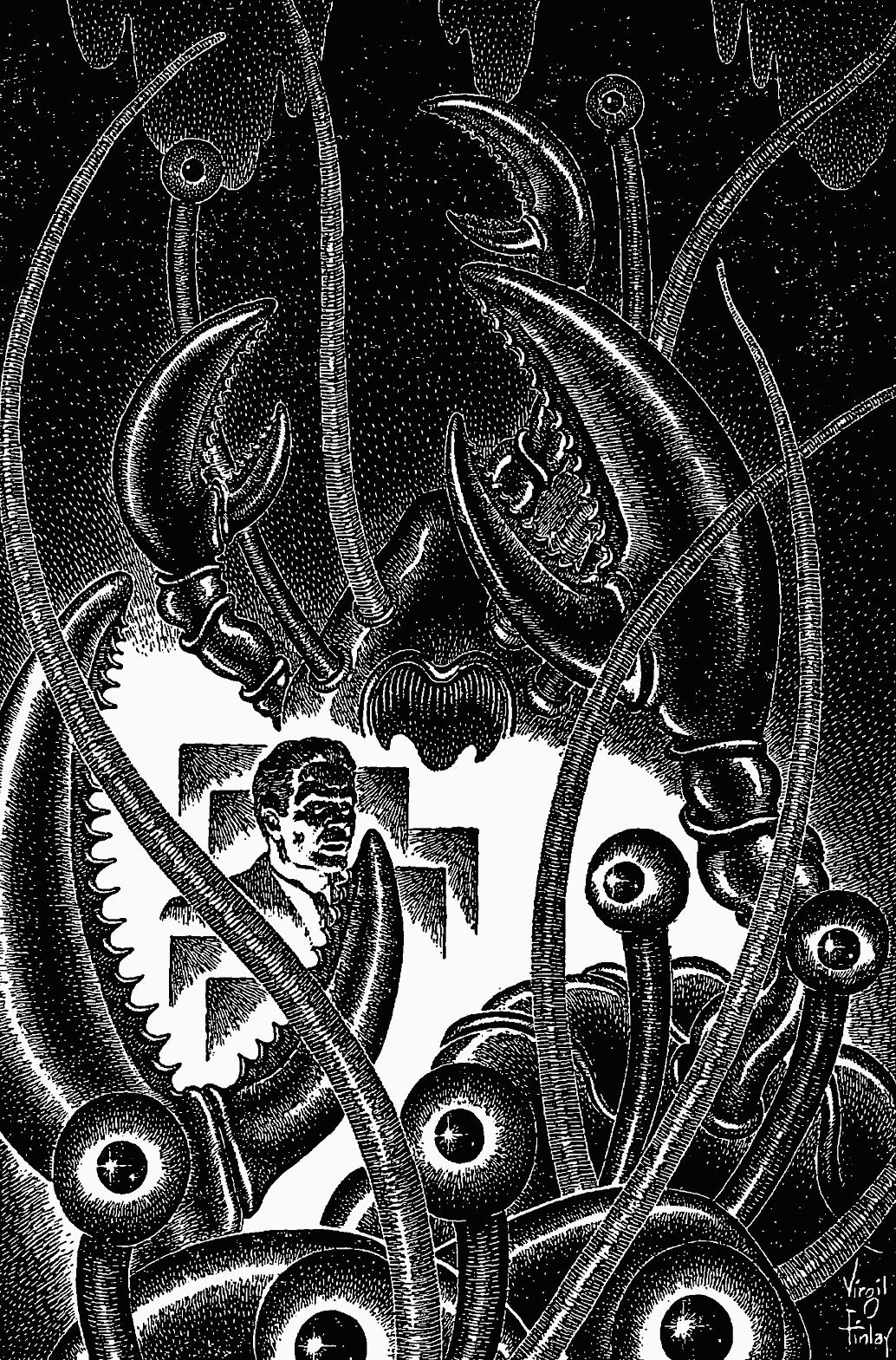
The Time Traveller reaches a far future inhabited by crab-like creatures

The Morlocks open a Sphinx statue housing the machine as bait to capture the distraught Traveller, not understanding that he can use it to escape. He reattaches the levers before travelling further ahead to roughly 30 million years from his own time. There, he sees the last living things on a dying Earth: crab-like creatures wandering blood-red beaches chasing enormous butterflies, in a world covered in lichenoid vegetation. He continues jumping forward through time, seeing Earth's rotation cease and the sun grow larger, redder, and dimmer, and the world falling silent and freezing as the last living things die out.

Overwhelmed, he returns to his own time, arriving at the laboratory just three hours after he originally left. He arrives late to his own dinner party, whereupon, after eating, the Traveller relates his adventures to his disbelieving visitors, producing as evidence two unusual white flowers Weena put in his pocket.

The original narrator relates that he returned to the Traveller's house the next day, finding him preparing for another journey and promising to return in a short time. After waiting for three years, however, the narrator says that the Traveller has not returned.

== Deleted text ==
A section from the thirteenth chapter of the serial published in New Review (May 1895, partway down p. 577 to p. 580, line 29) does not appear in either of the 1895 editions of the book. It was drafted at the suggestion of Wells's editor, William Ernest Henley, who wanted Wells to "oblige your editor" by lengthening the text with, among other things, an illustration of "the ultimate degeneracy" of humanity. "There was a slight struggle," Wells later recalled, "between the writer and W. E. Henley who wanted, he said, to put a little 'writing' into the tale. But the writer was in reaction from that sort of thing, the Henley interpolations were cut out again, and he had his own way with his text." This portion of the story was published elsewhere as "The Final Men" (1940) and "The Grey Man". The deleted text was also published by Forrest J Ackerman in an issue of the American edition of Perry Rhodan.

The deleted text recounts an incident immediately after the Traveller's escape from the Morlocks. He finds himself in the distant future in a frost-covered moorland with simple grasses and black bushes, populated with furry, hopping herbivores resembling kangaroos. He stuns or kills one with a rock, and upon closer examination realises they are probably the descendants of humans / Eloi / Morlocks. A gigantic, centipede-like arthropod approaches and the Traveller flees into the next day, finding that the creature has apparently eaten the tiny humanoid. The Dover Press and Easton Press editions of the novella restore this deleted segment.

== Scholarship ==
Significant scholarly commentary on The Time Machine began from the early 1960s, initially contained in various broad studies of Wells's early novels (such as Bernard Bergonzi's The Early H.G. Wells: A Study of the Scientific Romances) and studies of utopias/dystopias in science fiction (such as Mark R. Hillegas's The Future as Nightmare: H.G. Wells and the Anti-Utopians). Much critical and textual work was done in the 1970s, including the tracing of the very complex publication history of the text, its drafts, and unpublished fragments.

=== Academic publications ===
A further resurgence in scholarship came around the time of the novella's centenary in 1995, and a major outcome of this was the 1995 conference and substantial anthology of academic papers, which was collected in print as H.G. Wells's Perennial Time Machine. This publication then allowed the development of a guide-book for academic study at Master's and Ph.D. level: H.G. Wells's The Time Machine: A Reference Guide.

The scholarly journal The Wellsian has published around twenty articles on The Time Machine, and a U.S. academic journal The Undying Fire, devoted to H.G. Wells studies, has published three articles since its inception in 2002.

=== Subtext of the names Eloi and Morlock ===
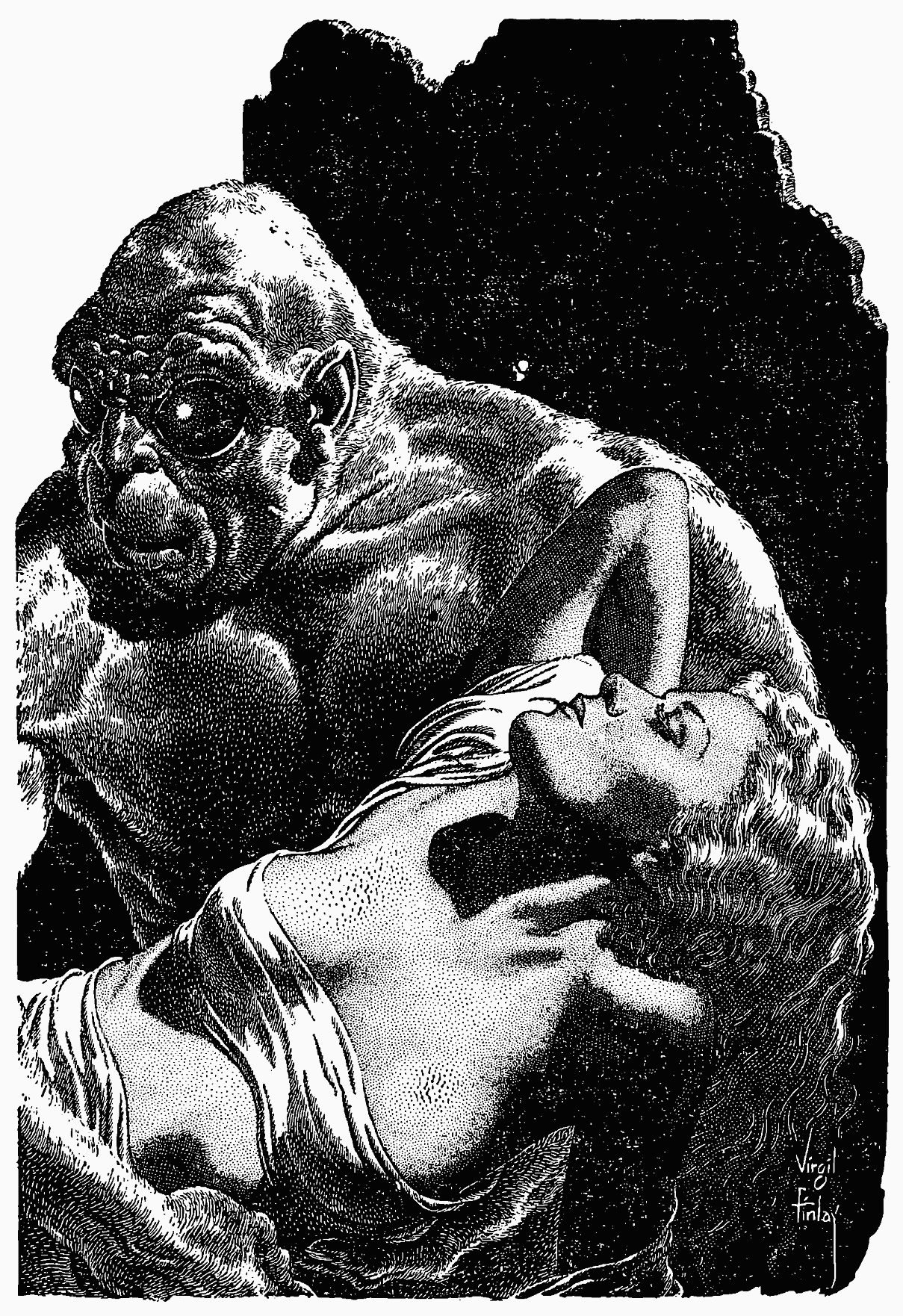
A Morlock with a female Eloi by Virgil Finlay, 1950

According to Leon Stover in his book The Time Machine: An invention, the name Eloi is the Hebrew plural for Elohim, or lesser gods, in the Old Testament. However, this derivation is unlikely as the word 'Elohim' is already in the plural, with the singular being 'eloah'.

Wells's source for the name Morlock is less clear. It may refer to the Canaanite god Moloch associated with child sacrifice. Stover also posited that the name Morlock may be a play on mollocks – what miners might call themselves – or a Scots word for rubbish; historian Larry Wolff has suggested that it is a reference to the Morlacchi community in Dalmatia.

Nicholas Ruddick’s annotated edition of The Time Machine summarizes the many likely sources of Wells’s two coinages. Morlock suggests mullock, warlock, Moloch, and Mohock, while Eloi suggests elite, elect, elfin, and Eloi, the Aramaic word for God uttered by Christ on the cross. Ruddick concludes, "The smooth, liquid, foreign ... tonal quality of the word [Eloi] contrasts with the harsher, quasi-Anglo-Saxon ‘Morlock,’ enforcing at the linguistic level the idea of distinct evolution based on social class.”

=== Symbols ===
The Time Machine can be read as a symbolic novel. The time machine itself can be viewed as a symbol, and there are several symbols in the narrative, including the Sphinx, flowers, and fire.

- The statue of the Sphinx is the place where the Morlocks hide the time machine and references the Sphinx in the story of Oedipus who gives a riddle that he must first solve before he can pass. The Sphinx appeared on the cover of the first London edition as requested by Wells and would have been familiar to his readers.
- The white flowers can symbolize Weena's devotion and innocence and contrast with the machinery of the time machine. They are the only proof that the Time Traveller's story is true.
- Fire symbolizes civilization: the Time Traveller uses it to ward off the Morlocks, but it escapes his control and turns into a forest fire.

== Adaptations ==
=== Radio and audio ===
==== Escape radio broadcasts ====
The CBS radio anthology Escape adapted The Time Machine twice, in 1948 starring Jeff Corey, and again in 1950 starring Lawrence Dobkin as the traveller. A script adapted by Irving Ravetch was used in both episodes. The Time Traveller was named Dudley and was accompanied by his sceptical friend Fowler as they travelled to the year 100,080.

==== 1997 Alien Voices audio drama ====
In 1997, an audio drama was released on cassette and CD by Alien Voices, starring Leonard Nimoy as the Time Traveller (named John in this adaptation) and John de Lancie as David Filby. John de Lancie's children, Owen de Lancie and Keegan de Lancie, played the parts of the Eloi. The drama is approximately two hours long and is more faithful to the story than several of the film adaptations. Some changes are made to reflect modern language and knowledge of science.

==== Radio Tales ====
In 1999, the novel was adapted in two parts by Winnie Waldron, narrated by and with music performed by Winifred Phillips, and broadcast on NPR as part of the Generations Radio Theater "Tales by the Masters" series.

==== 7th Voyage ====
In 2016, Alan Young read The Time Machine for 7th Voyage Productions, Inc., to celebrate the 120th Anniversary of H.G. Wells's novella.

==== 2009 BBC Radio 3 broadcast ====
Robert Glenister starred as the Time Traveller, with William Gaunt as H. G. Wells in a new 100-minute radio dramatisation by Philip Osment, directed by Jeremy Mortimer as part of a BBC Radio Science Fiction season. This was the first adaptation of the novella for British radio. It was first broadcast on 22 February 2009 on BBC Radio 3 and later published as a 2-CD BBC audio book.

The other cast members were:

- Donnla Hughes as Martha
- Gunnar Cauthery as Young H. G. Wells
- Stephen Critchlow as Filby, friend of the young Wells
- Chris Pavlo as Bennett, friend of the young Wells
- Manjeet Mann as Mrs. Watchett, the Traveller's housemaid
- Jill Crado as Weena, one of the Eloi and the Traveller's partner
- Robert Lonsdale, Inam Mirza, and Dan Starkey as other characters

The adaptation retained the nameless status of the Time Traveller and set it as a true story told to the young Wells by the time traveller, which Wells then re-tells as an older man to the US journalist, Martha, whilst firewatching on the roof of Broadcasting House during the Blitz. It also retained the deleted ending from the novella as a recorded message sent back to Wells from the future by the traveller using a prototype of his machine, with the traveller escaping the anthropoid creatures to 30 million AD at the end of the universe before disappearing or dying there.

==== Big Finish ====
On 5 September 2017, Big Finish Productions released an adaptation of The Time Machine. This adaptation was written by Marc Platt and starred Ben Miles as the Time Traveller.

Platt explained in an interview that adapting The Time Machine to audio was not much different from writing Doctor Who, and that he could see where some of the roots of early Doctor Who came from.

Television Adaptations

Wishbone

Season 1, Episode 23 episode “Bark to the Future” airing in 1995 has titular character Wishbone as the Time Traveller.

=== Film adaptations ===
==== 1949 BBC teleplay ====
The first visual adaptation of the book was a live teleplay broadcast from Alexandra Palace on 25 January 1949 by the BBC, which starred Russell Napier as the Time Traveller and Mary Donn as Weena. No recording of this live broadcast was made; the only record of the production is the script and a few black and white still photographs. A reading of the script, however, suggests that this teleplay remained fairly faithful to the book.

==== 1960 film ====
In 1960, the novella was made into a US science fiction film, also known promotionally as H.G. Wells's The Time Machine. The film starred Rod Taylor, Alan Young, and Yvette Mimieux. The film was produced and directed by George Pal, who also filmed a 1953 version of Wells's The War of the Worlds. The film won an Academy Award for time-lapse photographic effects showing the world changing rapidly.

In 1993, Rod Taylor hosted Time Machine: The Journey Back reuniting him with Alan Young and Whit Bissell, featuring the only sequel to Mr. Pal's classic film, written by the original screenwriter, David Duncan. In the special were Academy Award-winners special effect artists Wah Chang and Gene Warren.

==== 1978 television film ====
Sunn Classic Pictures produced a television film version of The Time Machine as a part of their "Classics Illustrated" series in 1978. It was a modernization of the Wells's story, making the Time Traveller a 1970s scientist working for a fictional US defence contractor, "the Mega Corporation". Dr. Neil Perry (John Beck), the Time Traveller, is described as one of Mega's most reliable contributors by his senior co-worker Branly (Whit Bissell, an alumnus of the 1960 adaptation). Perry's skill is demonstrated by his rapid reprogramming of an off-course missile, averting a disaster that could have destroyed Los Angeles. His reputation secures him a grant of $20 million for his time machine project. Although nearing completion, the corporation wants Perry to put the project on hold so that he can head a military weapon development project. Perry accelerates work on the time machine, permitting him to test it before being forced to work on the new project.

==== 2002 film ====
The 1960 film was remade in 2002, starring Guy Pearce as the Time Traveller, a mechanical engineering professor named Alexander Hartdegen, Mark Addy as his colleague David Philby, Sienna Guillory as Alex's ill-fated fiancée Emma, Phyllida Law as Mrs. Watchit, and Jeremy Irons as the Uber-Morlock. Playing a quick cameo as a shopkeeper was Alan Young, who featured in the 1960 film. (H. G. Wells himself can also be said to have a "cameo" appearance, in the form of a photograph on the wall of Alex's home, near the front door.)

The film was directed by Wells's great-grandson Simon Wells, with an even more revised plot that incorporated the ideas of paradoxes and changing the past. The place is changed from Richmond, Surrey, to downtown New York City, where the Time Traveller moves forward in time to find answers to his questions on 'Practical Application of Time Travel;' first in 2030 New York, to witness an orbital lunar catastrophe in 2037, before moving on to 802,701 for the main plot. He later briefly finds himself in 635,427,810 with toxic clouds and a world laid waste (presumably by the Morlocks) with devastation and Morlock artifacts stretching out to the horizon.

It was met with mixed reviews and earned $56 million before VHS/DVD sales. The Time Machine used a design that was very reminiscent of the one in the Pal film but was much larger and employed polished turned brass construction, along with rotating glass reminiscent of the Fresnel lenses common to lighthouses. (In Wells's original book, the Time Traveller mentioned his 'scientific papers on optics'.) Hartdegen becomes involved with a female Eloi named Mara, played by Samantha Mumba, who essentially takes the place of Weena, from the earlier versions of the story. In this film, the Eloi have, as a tradition, preserved a "stone language" that is identical to English. The Morlocks are much more barbaric and agile, and the Time Traveller has a direct impact on the plot.

=== Derivative work ===
==== Time After Time (1979 film) ====
In Time After Time, H. G. Wells invents a time machine and shows it to some friends in a manner similar to the first part of the novella. He does not know that one of his friends is Jack The Ripper. The Ripper, fleeing police, escapes to the future (1979), but without a key which prevents the machine from remaining in the future. When it does return home, Wells follows him in order to protect the future (which he imagines to be a utopia) from the Ripper. In turn, the film inspired a 2017 TV series of the same name.

==== Time Kid (2003 film) ====
Time Kid is a 2003 animated science-fiction television movie loosely based on H.G. Wells' The Time Machine. It follows Tom Spender, a teenager who uses his father's time machine to travel into the future to rescue his lost scientist dad.

=== Comics ===
Classics Illustrated was the first to adapt The Time Machine into a comic book format, issuing an American edition in July 1956.

The Classics Illustrated version was published in French by Classiques Illustres in Dec 1957, and Classics Illustrated Strato Publications (Australian) in 1957, and Kuvitettuja Klassikkoja (a Finnish edition) in November 1957. There were also Classics Illustrated Greek editions in 1976, Swedish in 1987, German in 1992 and 2001, and a Canadian reprint of the English edition in 2008.

In 1976, Marvel Comics published a new version of The Time Machine, as #2 in their Marvel Classics Comics series, with art by Alex Niño. (This adaptation was originally published in 1973 by Pendulum Press as part of their Pendulum Now Age Classics series; it was colourised and reprinted by Marvel in 1976.)

In 1977, Polish painter Waldemar Andrzejewski adapted the novel as a 22-page comic book, written in Polish by Antoni Wolski.

From April 1990, Eternity Comics published a three-issue miniseries adaptation of The Time Machine, written by Bill Spangler and illustrated by John Ross — this was collected as a trade paperback graphic novel in 1991.

In 2018, US imprint Insight Comics published an adaptation of the novel, as part of their "H. G. Wells" series of comic books.

In IDW's 2024 comic series Godzilla's Monsterpiece Theatre, the Time Traveler appears as a character alongside other fictional characters of the era, such as Sherlock Holmes, Count Dracula and Jay Gatsby. In the comic, he travels through time to 1922 in order to help the other characters fight Godzilla. This version of the character is known as the "Time Machinist" and has a history with Godzilla.

== Sequels by other authors ==
Wells's novella has become one of the cornerstones of science-fiction literature. As a result, it has spawned many offspring. Works expanding on Wells's story include:

- La Belle Valence by Théo Varlet and André Blandin (1923) in which a squadron of World War I soldiers find the Time Machine and are transported back to the Spanish town of Valencia in the 14th century.
- Die Rückkehr der Zeitmaschine (1946) by Egon Friedell was the first direct sequel. It dwells heavily on the technical details of the machine and the time-paradoxes it might cause when the time machine was used to visit the past. After visiting a futuristic 1995 where London floats in the sky and the weather is created by companies, as well as the year 2123 where he meets two Egyptians who study history using "intuition" instead of science, the time traveller, who is given the name James MacMorton, travels to the past and ends up weeks before the time machine was built, causing it to disappear. He is forced to use the miniature version of his time machine, which already existed at that time, to send telegraphic messages through time to a friend (the author), instructing him to send him things that will allow him to build a new machine. After returning to the present, he tells his friend what happened. The 24,000-word German original was translated into English by Eddy C. Bertin in the 1940s and eventually published in paperback as The Return of the Time Machine.
- The Hertford Manuscript by Richard Cowper, first published in 1976. It features a "manuscript", which reports the Time Traveller's activities after the end of the original story. According to this manuscript, the Time Traveller disappeared, because his Time Machine had been damaged by the Morlocks without him knowing it. He only found out when it stopped operating during his next attempted time travel. He found himself on 27 August 1665, in London during the outbreak of the Great Plague of London. The rest of the novel is devoted to his efforts to repair the Time Machine and leave this time period before getting infected with the disease. He also has an encounter with Robert Hooke. He eventually dies of the disease on 20 September 1665. The story gives a list of subsequent owners of the manuscript until 1976. It also gives the name of the Time Traveller as Robert James Pensley, born to James and Martha Pensley in 1850 and disappearing without trace on 18 June 1894.
- The Space Machine by Christopher Priest, first published in 1976. Because of the movement of planets, stars, and galaxies, for a time machine to stay in one spot on Earth as it travels through time, it must also follow the Earth's trajectory through space. In Priest's book, a travelling salesman damages a Time Machine similar to the original, and arrives on Mars, just before the start of the invasion described in The War of the Worlds. H. G. Wells appears as a minor character.
- Morlock Night by K. W. Jeter, first published in 1979. A steampunk fantasy novel in which the Morlocks, having studied the Traveller's machine, duplicate it and invade Victorian London. This culminates in Westminster Abbey being used as a butcher shop of human beings by the Morlocks in the 20th century, and a total disruption and collapse of the time stream. There the hero and Merlin must find – and destroy – the Time Machine, to restore the time stream and history.
- Time Machine II by George Pal and Joe Morhaim, published in 1981. The Time Traveller, named George, and the pregnant Weena try to return to his time, but instead land in the London Blitz, dying during a bombing raid. Their newborn son is rescued by an American ambulance driver and grows up in the United States under the name Christopher Jones. Sought out by the lookalike son of James Filby, Jones goes to England to collect his inheritance, leading ultimately to George's journals, and the Time Machine's original plans. He builds his own machine with 1970s upgrades and seeks his parents in the future. Pal also worked on a detailed synopsis for a second sequel, which was partly filmed for a 1980s U.S. TV special on the making of Pal's film version of The Time Machine, using the original actors. This second sequel, the plot of which does not seem to fit with Pal's first, opens with the Time Traveller enjoying a happy life with Weena, in a future world in which the Morlocks have died out. He and his son return to save Filby in World War I. This act changes the future, causing the nuclear war not to happen. He and his son are thus cut off from Weena in the distant future. The Time Traveller thus has to solve a dilemma – allow his friend to die, and cause the later death of millions, or give up Weena forever.
- The Man Who Loved Morlocks (1981) and "The Truth About Weena" (1998) are two different sequels, the former a novel and the latter a short story, by David J. Lake. Each of them concerns the Time Traveller's return to the future. In the former, he discovers that he cannot enter any period in time he has already visited, forcing him to travel into the further future, where he finds love with a woman whose race evolved from Morlock stock. In the latter, he is accompanied by Wells and succeeds in rescuing Weena and bringing her back to the 1890s, where her political ideas cause a peaceful revolution.
- The Time Ships, by Stephen Baxter, was first published in 1995. This sequel was officially authorised by the Wells estate to mark the centenary of the original's publication. In its wide-ranging narrative, the Traveller's desire to return and rescue Weena is thwarted by the fact that he has changed history (by telling his tale to his friends, one of whom published the account). With a Morlock (in the new history, the Morlocks are intelligent and cultured), he travels through the multiverse as increasingly complicated timelines unravel around him, eventually meeting mankind's far future descendants, whose ambition is to travel back to the birth of the universe, and modify the way the multiverse will unfold. This sequel includes many nods to the prehistory of Wells's story in the names of characters and chapters.
- In "The Richmond Enigma" by John DeChancie, Sherlock Holmes investigates the disappearance of the Time Traveller, a contemporary and, in this story, a distant relative. The intervention of Holmes and Watson succeeds in calling back the missing Time Traveller, who has resolved to prevent the time machine's existence, out of concern for the danger it could make possible. The story appeared in Sherlock Holmes in Orbit (1995)
- The Steam Man of the Prairie and the Dark Rider Get Down: A Dime Novel by Joe R. Lansdale, first published in The Long Ones (1999). In this story, the Time Traveller accidentally damages the space-time continuum and is transformed into the vampire-like Dark Rider.
- The 2003 short story "On the Surface" by Robert J. Sawyer begins with this quote from the Wells original: "I have suspected since that the Morlocks had even partially taken it [the time machine] to pieces while trying in their dim way to grasp its purpose." In the Sawyer story, the Morlocks develop a fleet of time machines and use them to conquer the same far future Wells depicted at the end of the original, by which time, because the sun has grown red and dim and thus no longer blinds them, they can reclaim the surface of the world.
- The Time Traveller and his machine appear in the story Allan and the Sundered Veil by Alan Moore and Kevin O'Neill, which acts as a prequel to The League of Extraordinary Gentlemen, Volume One. The Time Traveller shares an adventure with fellow literary icons Allan Quatermain, John Carter, and Randolph Carter.
- David Haden's novelette The Time Machine: A Sequel (2010) is a direct sequel, picking up where the original finished. The Time Traveller goes back to rescue Weena but finds the Eloi less simple than he first imagined, and time travel far more complicated.
- Simon Baxter's novel The British Empire: Psychic Battalions Against the Morlocks (2010) imagines a steampunk/cyberpunk future in which the British Empire has remained the dominant world force until the Morlocks arrive from the future.
- Hal Colebatch's Time-Machine Troopers (2011) (Acashic Publishers) is twice the length of the original. In it, the Time Traveller returns to the future world about 18 years after the time he escaped from the Morlocks, taking with him Robert Baden-Powell, the real-world founder of the Boy Scout movement. They set out to teach the Eloi self-reliance and self-defence against the Morlocks, but the Morlocks capture them. H. G. Wells and Winston Churchill are also featured as characters.
- Paul Schullery's The Time Traveller's Tale: Chronicle of a Morlock Captivity (2012) continues the story in the voice and manner of the original Wells book. After many years' absence, the Time Traveller returns and describes his further adventures. His attempts to mobilize the Eloi in their own defence against the Morlocks failed when he was captured by the Morlocks. Much of the book is occupied with his deeply unsettling discoveries about the Morlock / Eloi symbiosis, his gradual assimilation into Morlock society, and his ultimately successful attempt to discover the true cause of humanity's catastrophic transformation into two such tragic races.
- The Great Illustrated Classics in 1992 published an adaptation of Wells's novella that adds an extra destination to the Time Traveller's adventure: Stopping in 2200 AD on his way back home, he becomes caught up in a civil war between factions of a technocratic society that was established to avert ecological catastrophe.
- Beyond the Time Machine by Burt Libe (2002). The first of two Time Machine sequels written by US writer Burt Libe, it continues the story of the Time Traveller: where he finally settles down, including his rescue of Weena and his subsequent family with her. Highlighted are exploits of his daughters Narra and her younger sister Belinda; coping with their 33rd-Century existence; considering their unusual past and far-Future heritage. Doing some time travelling of their own, the daughters revisit 802,701 AD, discovering that the so-called dual-specie Eloi and Morlock inhabitants actually are far more complex and complicated than their father's initial appraisal.
- Tangles in Time by Burt Libe (2005). The second of two Time Machine sequels written by American writer Burt Libe, it continues the story of younger daughter Belinda, now grown at age 22. Her father (the original Time Traveller) has just died from old age, and she and Weena (her mother) now must decide what to do with the rest of their lives. Weena makes a very unusual decision, leaving Belinda to search for her own place in time. Also, with further time travel, she locates her two long-lost brothers, previously thought to be dead; she also meets and rescues a young man from the far future, finding herself involved in a very confusing relationship.
- Epilogue: Time Machine Chronicles is a 2010 sequel by Jaime V. Batista

== The Time Traveller ==
Although the Time Traveller's real name is never given in the original novella, other sources have named him:

- The 1960 film named him H. George Wells, although he was only called George in dialogue.
- In the 1978 telefilm version of the story, the Time Traveller (this time a modern-day American) is named Dr. Neil Perry.
- H. G. Wells's great-grandson, Simon Wells, directed a 2002 remake where the Time Traveller's name is Alexander Hartdegen.
- In The Time Ships, Stephen Baxter's sequel to The Time Machine, the Time Traveller encounters his younger self via time travel. His younger self reacts with embarrassment to his older self's knowledge of his real names: "I held up my hand; I had an inspiration. "No. I will use—if you will permit—Moses." He took a deep pull on his brandy, and gazed at me with genuine anger in his grey eyes. "How do you know about that?" Moses—my hated first name, for which I had been endlessly tormented at school—and which I had kept a secret since leaving home!" This is a reference to H. G. Wells's story "The Chronic Argonauts", the story which grew into The Time Machine, in which the inventor of the Time Machine is named Dr. Moses Nebogipfel; the surname of Wells's first inventor graces another character in Baxter's book (see above).
- In the Doctor Who comic strip story "The Eternal Present", the character of Theophilus Tolliver is implied to be the Time Traveller of Wells's novella. Also featured in Doctor Who is Wells, himself, appearing in the television serial Timelash. The events of this story are portrayed as having inspired Wells to write The Time Machine.

== See also ==
- El anacronópete
- "The Chronic Argonauts"
- Dysgenics
- Time travel in fiction
- Soft science fiction
- Human extinction
- List of time travel works of fiction
- The Science Fiction Hall of Fame, Volume Two, an anthology of the greatest science fiction novels prior to 1965, as judged by the Science Fiction Writers of America
- Perelandra, A work inspired in part by the Time Machine. In it, the Green Lady, A version of Weena, gives Dr. Ransom a flower
- Societal collapse
- 1895 in science fiction
