= Eloi =

Fictional species created by H. G. Wells

- The Time Machine race
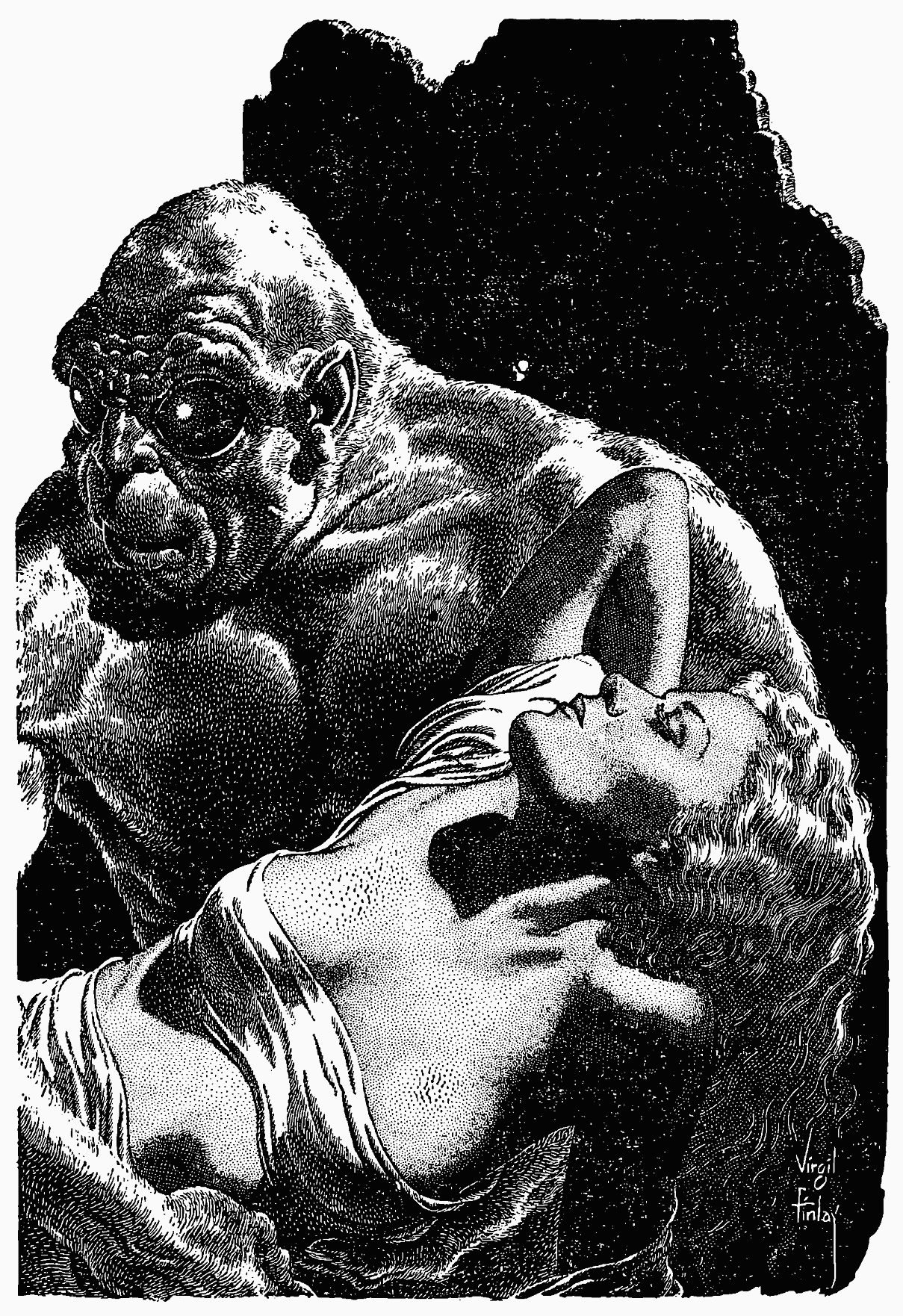
- A Morlock carrying an Eloi, by Virgil Finlay
- First appearance: The Time Machine
- Created by: H. G. Wells

In-universe information
- Home world: Earth
- Type: Humanoid

The Eloi are one of the two fictional species of post-humans, along with the Morlocks, in H. G. Wells' 1895 novel The Time Machine.

== In H. G. Wells' The Time Machine ==
By the year AD 802,701, humanity has diverged into two separate species: the Eloi and the Morlocks. The Eloi live a banal life of ease on the surface of the Earth while the Morlocks live underground, tending machinery and providing food, clothing, and inventory for the Eloi. The narration suggests that the divergence of species may have been the result of a widening separation between social classes. The Eloi are suggested to be the descendants of a privileged, surface-dwelling, upper class, which once dominated the subterranean working class. The Time Traveller, the story's protagonist, surmises that the surface-dwelling civilization had reached its zenith and devolved into decadence and indifference. Meanwhile, the "underworlders", who supported the surface world, grew accustomed to labour and harsh, underground existence, and degenerated into the Morlocks. At some point, the Morlocks, who had continued providing for the helpless Eloi (the Time Traveller guesses this may at first have been out of tradition or intrinsic habit) began feeding on their above-ground counterparts and now raise them like cattle to serve as their food supply, consuming the Eloi after being allowed to breed.

The Eloi are described as anatomically smaller than modern humans (standing roughly four feet tall), with shoulder-length curly hair, pointed chins, large eyes, small ears, small mouths with bright red thin lips, and sub-human intelligence ("on the intellectual level of one of our five-year-old children"). Their bodies are beautiful in appearance but surprisingly feeble. They do not perform much work, except to feed, play, and mate, and are characterized by apathy; when Weena falls into a river, none of the other Eloi move to help her (she is rescued instead by the Time Traveller). They live on a diet of fruits and vegetables, which may be cultivated for them by the Morlocks. Their language is described as "very sweet and liquid." The Eloi seem to dread only darkness and always sleep in droves within their "palaces". This is later revealed to be because the Morlocks ascend to harvest them when darkness falls.

A portion of the book written for the New Review version, later published as a separate short story, reveals that a visit by the Time Traveller to the even more distant future results in his encountering rabbit-like hopping herbivores, apparently the descendants of the Eloi. They are described as being plantigrade, with longer hind legs and tailless, being covered with straight greyish hair that "thickened about the head into a Skye terrier's mane", having human-like hands (described as fore feet), and having a roundish head with a projecting forehead and forward-looking eyes that were obscured by lank hair.

The two divergent types of humanity can be considered as an social allegory of the split of the capitalists and the labourers in industrial London during H.G. Wells' time.

== Film adaptations ==
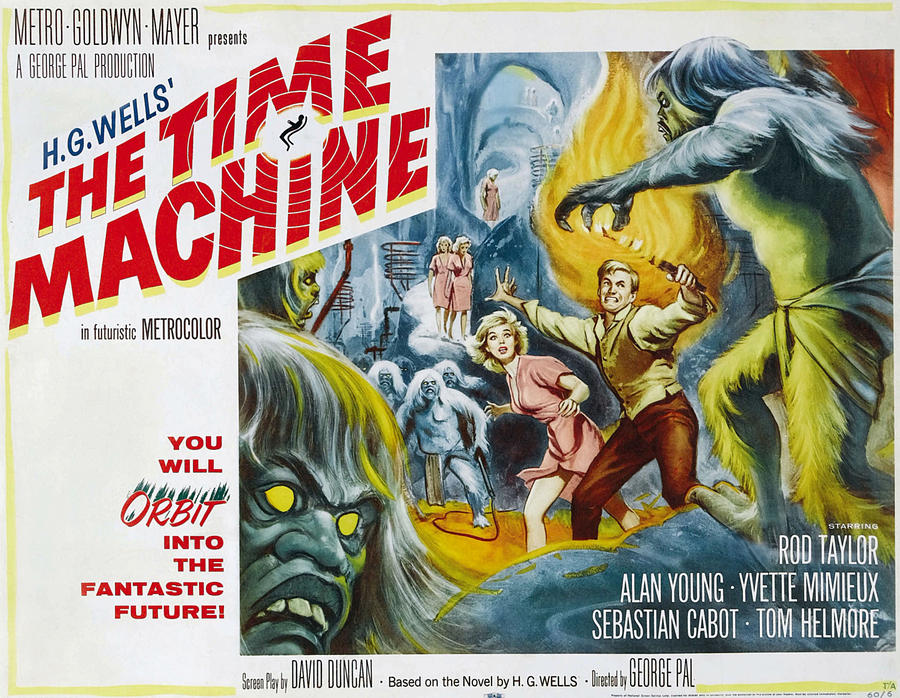
In a poster for the 1960 film, several Eloi are shown surrounded by Morlocks.

In the 1960 film version of the book, the Eloi are depicted as identical to modern humans but small, blond, and blue-eyed. The Morlocks use an air raid siren to put the Eloi into a trance state and lure them into their caves. One of the Eloi is motivated to beat a Morlock to death when it attacks the Time Traveller.

In the 2002 movie adaptation of The Time Machine, the Eloi are depicted as identical to modern humans with a hunter-gatherer lifestyle and sport primitive-style clothing and appear to be an ethnic amalgamation of various ethnic groups but maintain the English language as an intellectual exercise.

== In Dan Simmons' Ilium ==
In Dan Simmons' Ilium novel, "Eloi" is a nickname for the lazy, uneducated, and uncultured descendants of the human race after the post-humans have left Earth. The name is a reference to Wells' Eloi. Old-style humans and post-humans rule in Simmons' novel, with the Eloi being kept in "zoos" in restricted areas on Earth. The Eloi are technically adept but do not understand the technology; they regress and unlearn millennia of culture, thought and reason, until they are satisfied with the pleasure of merely existing.

== In Greg Bear's Moving Mars ==
In Greg Bear' Moving Mars novel, "Eloi" is a nickname for the age-extenders who leave Earth for Mars in order to avoid age restrictions on Earth. The name is a reference to Wells' Eloi.
