= Morlock Night =

1979 science fiction novel by K. W. Jeter

First edition (publ. DAW Books) Cover art by Josh Kirby

Morlock Night is a science fiction novel by American writer K. W. Jeter. It was published in 1979. In a letter to Locus Magazine in April 1987, Jeter coined the word "steampunk" to describe it and other novels by James Blaylock and Tim Powers.

Morlock Night uses the ideas of H. G. Wells in which the Morlocks of Wells' 1895 novella The Time Machine themselves use the device to travel back into the past and menace Victorian London. King Arthur and Merlin appear as England's saviors.

== Sources ==
- Worlds Enough and Time: Explorations of Time in Science Fiction and Fantasy by Gary Westfahl
- King Arthur's Modern Return (Garland Reference Library of the Humanities) by Debra Mancoff (on page 8 and page 313)
- Critical Mass: A Primer for Living with the Future by Pat McGrew (on page 100)
- Space, Time, and Infinity: Essays on Fantastic Literature by Brian Stableford (page 87)
