= Death Arms (novel) =

1987 novel by K. W. Jeter

Death Arms is a novel by K. W. Jeter published in 1987, though according to Jeter's afterword, he began writing it in 1972 and completed it in 1978.

== Premise ==
Death Arms is a novel in which a scheme involves attempting to assassinate the entire collective unconscious of humanity.

== Reception ==
Dave Langford reviewed Death Arms for White Dwarf #92, and stated that "Stripped of savage imagery, this would be a thin story; Jeter drives it at stomach jolting pace to the hero's final realization that he can save the world despite being horribly dead."

== Reviews ==
- Review by Mike Moir (1987) in Vector 139
- Review by Dan Chow (1987) in Locus, #320 September 1987
- Review by Paul J. McAuley (1989) in Interzone, #30 July-August 1989
- Review by Glenn Grant (1990) in The New York Review of Science Fiction, July 1990
