= The Infernal Machine (2024 book) =

2024 book by Steven Johnson

The Infernal Machine: A True Story of Dynamite, Terror, and the Rise of the Modern Detective is a 2024 history book by American popular science author Steven Johnson.

== Overview ==
The book offers a popular history of the interplay between anarchist propaganda of the deed, the invention of dynamite, and the emergence of new policing tactics to counter the anarchist threat in the late 19th and early 20th century, from the 1881 Assassination of Alexander II of Russia to the First Red Scare that ended in 1920. The book particularly focuses on New York City, covering the activities of anarchists such as Alexander Berkman and Emma Goldman, as well as the activities of police officers such as Arthur H. Woods, Joseph Faurot, Joseph Petrosino, Owen Eagan, and Amedeo Polignani. Johnson argues that, although the anarchists killed fewer people than the brutal early 20th century capitalism, the violent anarchist tactics ultimately alienated public opinion and backfired. He argues that the police officers were able to both successfully rehabilitate the image of the New York City Police Department and were successful in implementing new policing, including fingerprinting and wiretapping.

== Critical reception ==
Kirkus Reviews reviewed the book as "smart, accessible, and highly readable," saying that "Johnson makes history part of an ongoing story we all need to consider." Publishers Weekly gave the book a starred review, praising it as "a captivating saga of vehement political passions quelled by cold technocracy." Journalist Clyde Haberman of The New York Times wrote that Johnson "lays out the worlds of the bombers and their pursuers in admirable detail and with sturdy prose graced by an occasional light touch... we are taken skillfully through a stunning procession of horror, much of it barely remembered in the fog of more recent terrorist acts."

Writing in Foreign Affairs, British historian Lawrence Freedman praised the book as "enthralling."

Journalist Bryan Burrough of The Wall Street Journal gave the book a more mixed review, describing it as the "revved-up, slimmed-down Hollywood-ready version" of the story of early 20th century American anarchism, "complete with jump cuts, cliffhangers and scenes of violence so detailed they feel like slow motion," but criticising the book for its "revolving door of characters" and for being unconvincing in its thesis that anarchism led to the rise of scientific policing.
