= Merlock =

Merlock can refer to:

- The Merlock Mountains in J.R.R. Tolkien's poem The Mewlips (published 1962).
- Merlock the Magician from Disney's Scrooge McDuck Universe (1990).
- One of the wizards faced by contestants at the end of Nick Arcade's bonus round (1992).
- Merlock Holmes, a character in Flint the Time Detective (1998).
- A Sri Lankan heavy metal band documented in Arise (film) (2010).

== See also ==
- Morlock (disambiguation)
