= Morelock =

Morelock is a surname. Notable people with the surname include:

- Eunice Hutto Morelock (1904–1947), a pioneer professor at Bob Jones College and possibly the first female chief academic officer of a coeducational college in the United States
- Harry Morelock (1869–1949), American Major League Baseball player
- Sterling L. Morelock (1890–1964), United States Army private and recipient of the Medal of Honor
