= K. W. Jeter =

American novelist

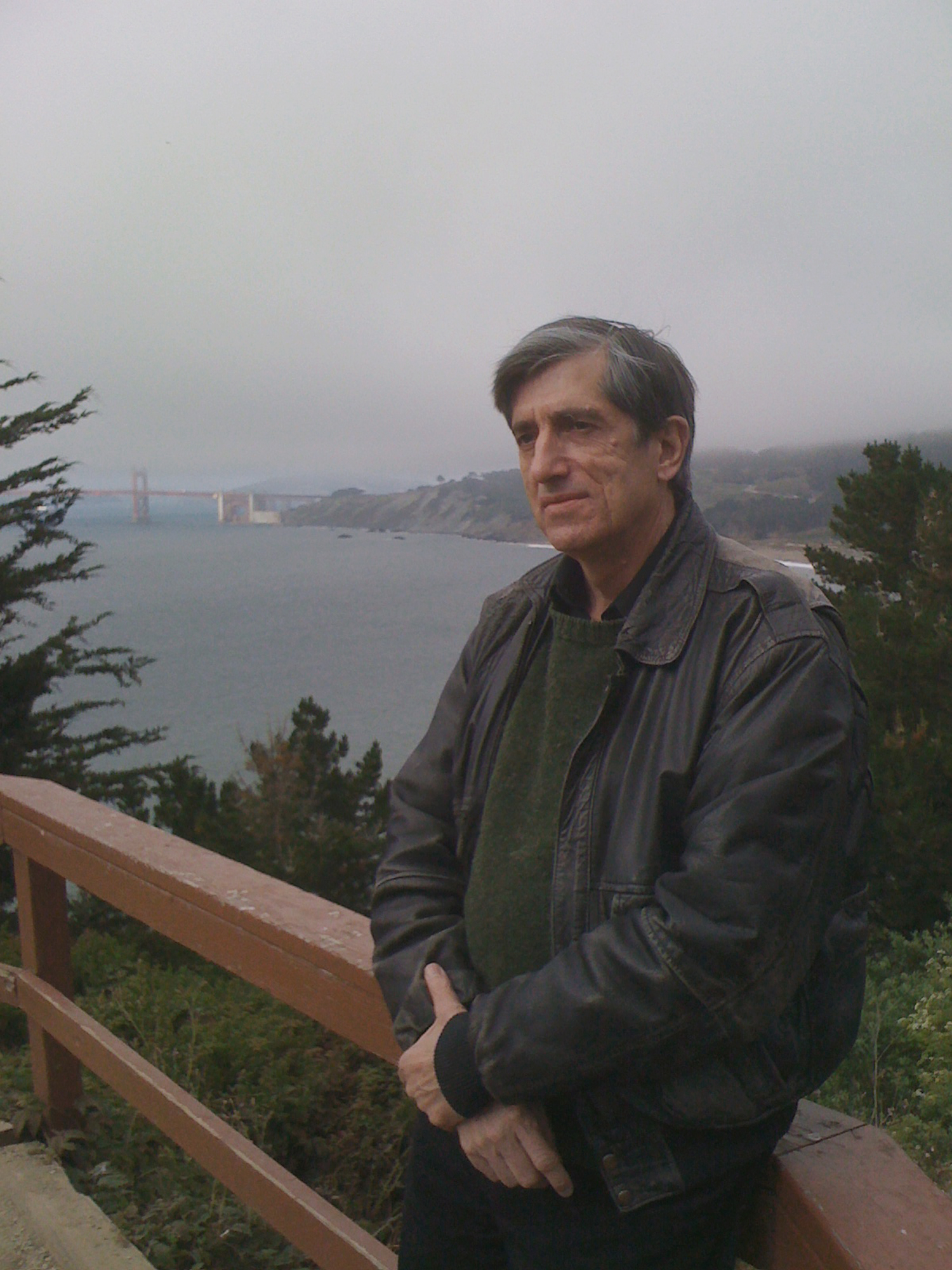
- Jeter in San Francisco (2011)
- Born: Kevin Wayne Jeter; March 26, 1950 (age 76)
- Education: California State University, Fullerton (BA)
- Occupation: Author
- Years active: 1975–present

Kevin Wayne Jeter (born March 26, 1950) is an American science fiction and horror author known for his literary writing style, dark themes, and paranoid, unsympathetic characters. He has written novels set in the Star Trek and Star Wars universes, and has written three sequels to Blade Runner. Jeter coined the term "steampunks".

== Biography ==
Jeter went to Buena Park High School, and later attended college at California State University, Fullerton, where he became friends with James P. Blaylock and Tim Powers, and through them, Philip K. Dick. Jeter was the inspiration for the character Kevin in Dick's semi-autobiographical novel, Valis. Many of Jeter's books focus on the subjective nature of reality in a way reminiscent of Dick's.

Philip K. Dick enthusiastically recommended Jeter's early cyberpunk novel, Dr. Adder. Due to its violent and sexually provocative content, it took Jeter around ten years to find a publisher for it. Jeter would also coin the term steampunk, in reference to cyberpunk in a letter to Locus in April 1987, in order to describe the steam-technology, alternate-history works that he published along with his friends, Blaylock and Powers. Jeter's steampunk novels are Morlock Night, Infernal Devices, and its sequels Fiendish Schemes (2013) and Grim Expectations (2017).

As well as his own original novels, K. W. Jeter has written three authorized novel sequels to the critically acclaimed 1982 motion picture Blade Runner, which was adapted from Philip K. Dick's novel Do Androids Dream of Electric Sheep?

== Bibliography ==
=== Original novels ===
- Seeklight (1975)
- The Dreamfields (1976)
- Morlock Night (1979; a sequel to H. G. Wells' The Time Machine)
- Soul Eater (1983)
- Dark Seeker (1987)
- Mantis (1987)
- Farewell Horizontal (1989)
- In the Land of the Dead (1989)
- The Night Man (1989)
- Alligator Alley (1989), with Mink Mole a.k.a. Tim MacNamara
- Madlands (1991)
- Wolf Flow (1992)
- Noir (1998)
- The Kingdom of Shadows (2011)
- Death's Apprentice (2012), with Gareth Jefferson Jones

==== Dr. Adder trilogy ====
- Dr. Adder (written 1971; published 1984)
- The Glass Hammer (1985)
- Death Arms (written 1978; published 1987)

==== George Dower trilogy ====
1. Infernal Devices (1987)
2. Fiendish Schemes (2013)
3. Grim Expectations (2017)

=== Novellas ===
- Ninja Two-Fifty (2006)

=== Star Wars books ===
- The Mandalorian Armor (1998)
- Slave Ship (1998)
- Hard Merchandise (1999)

=== Blade Runner sequels ===
- Blade Runner 2: The Edge of Human (1995)
- Blade Runner 3: Replicant Night (1996)
- Blade Runner 4: Eye and Talon (2000)

=== Star Trek: Deep Space Nine novels ===
- Bloodletter (1993)
- Warped (1995)

=== Comic book works ===
- Mister E (DC) (1991)
- Star Trek: N-Vector (Wildstorm) (2000)

=== The Kim Oh Thrillers (as Kim Oh) ===
- Real Dangerous Girl (Editions Herodiade Oct. 2011)
- Real Dangerous Job (Editions Herodiade Oct. 2011)
- Real Dangerous People (Editions Herodiade Oct. 2011)
- Real Dangerous Place (Editions Herodiade July 2012)
- Real Dangerous Fun (Editions Herodiade July 2014)
- Real Dangerous Ride (Editions Herodiade Mar. 2015)
- Real Dangerous Plan (Editions Herodiade Aug. 2015)
