= Infernal Devices (Jeter novel) =

1987 novel by K. W. Jeter

Infernal Devices : A Mad Victorian Fantasy
- First edition cover
- Author: K. W. Jeter
- Cover artist: Wayne Barlowe
- Language: English
- Genre: Steampunk, Science fiction
- Published: 1987 St. Martin's Press
- Publication place: United States
- Media type: Print (hardback & paperback)
- Pages: 282 pages
- ISBN: 0-312-00706-X
- OCLC: 15164284
- Dewey Decimal: 813/.54 19
- LC Class: PS3560.E85 I5 1987

Infernal Devices is a steampunk novel by K. W. Jeter, published in 1987. The novel was republished in 2011 by Angry Robot Books with a new introduction by the author, cover art by John Coulthart, and an afterword by Jeff VanderMeer.

== Plot ==
The novel takes place primarily in Victorian London.

The story begins as a mysterious Brown Leather Man enters George Dower's watch shop with a strange device in need of repair, claiming it was made by George's father, a brilliant watchmaker skilled in all forms of clockwork devices. George, who has inherited his father's shop, but not his father's talent, agrees to look at the device, although he knows his chances of repairing it are slim at best. George is quickly dragged into an ongoing conflict involving the Royal Anti-Society, the Godly Army and the Ladies Union for the Suppression of Carnal Vice. His investigation leads him to a strange neighborhood in London, Wetwick, which is inhabited by denizens who are a hybrid of humans and fish.

Another of George's customers are an impatient man who wears blue-glass spectacles and his female companion, who both use a slang which is strange to George as a Victorian Englishman but which modern readers will recognize as twentieth-century American vernacular. (The strangers are not time travelers but a Victorian English citizens who possessed a device which enabled them to view what is, for them, the future; they have learned late twentieth-century slang through lip-reading.)

As the story develops, George realizes that his father was more skilled than even he knew; his father had begun experimenting with building clockwork humans, finishing with an automaton who is an exact double of George himself, but which possesses superior sexual abilities and a skill with the violin comparable to Paganini. Inevitably, a woman abducts George in the mistaken belief that she has captured his clockwork twin.

== Reception ==
J. Michael Caparula reviewed Infernal Devices in Space Gamer/Fantasy Gamer No. 84. Caparula commented that "I loved this book, given my penchant for Victoriana, and also because of Jeter's colorful characterizations, superb plotting, and luminescent writing style, which recalls that of Blaylock. What's more, humor abounds, especially in the character of Scape, and in the irresistable [sic] ending, which is too good to be true."

== Reviews ==
- Review by Faren Miller (1987) in Locus, #314 March 1987
- Review by Robert Reilly (1987) in Fantasy Review, June 1987
- Review [French] by Pascal J. Thomas (1987) in A&A, #108-109
- Review by Don D'Ammassa (1987) in Science Fiction Chronicle, #95 August 1987
- Review by Don D'Ammassa (1987) in Science Fiction Chronicle, #96 September 1987
- Review by Terry Broome (1988) in Paperback Inferno, #75
- Review [French] by Richard Comballot (1989) in Fiction, #407
- Review [French] by Jonathan Dornet (1989) in A&A, #120-120bis
- Review [French] by Thierry Bosch (1989) in Yellow Submarine, #62
- Review by Charles de Lint (1989) in Elliott's Bookline
- Review by Brendan Byrne (2011) in Strange Horizons, 20 June 2011
- Review by uncredited (2011) in Weird Tales #358
