= Operation Sea Lion in fiction =

Alternate history works concerning Operation Sea Lion

There is a significant body of fiction set in an alternate history or a secret history, where the Operation Sea Lion, a German plan to invade Britain during World War II, is attempted or successfully carried out. However, analyses by experts during a wargame conducted in 1974 concluded that there was little chance of the plan succeeding.

== Literature ==
- Collaborator, a 2003 novel by Murray Davies.
- The Man in the High Castle, a 1962 novel by Philip K. Dick.
- Peace in Our Time (1946 – first performance 1947) by Noël Coward.
- Resistance by Owen Sheers, which sets the successful invasion in 1944 after a failed invasion of Normandy rather than in 1940.
- SS-GB by Len Deighton.
- "If Hitler Had Invaded England", a short story by C. S. Forester in his 1971 volume of short stories Gold from Crete, following the progress of a German invasion fleet from its embarkation in France to its destruction in the fields of Kent.
- The Thursday Next novels by Jasper Fforde are set in an alternate universe in which Operation Sea Lion was successful. The German occupying force is eventually driven out, and by the time of The Eyre Affair England is a republic.
- Weaver, 2008 novel by Stephen Baxter.
- Invading England, a novel by Harry Bold from 2019, describes a successful Invasion of England with strictly the means available to the antagonists in July 1940.
- The Abominable, 2013 novel by Dan Simmons.
- Hellsing, a manga series by Kouta Hirano (first published 1997, ended 2008) features an unsuccessful attempt to complete Operation Sea Lion in the modern age by remnants of the Wehrmacht

== Film ==
- Bedknobs and Broomsticks (1971), a force lands, but is scared off with magic.
- It Happened Here (1966).
- Jackboots on Whitehall (2010), Nazis invade Great Britain by drilling under the English Channel and up through the cobblestones on Whitehall, London.
- LOLA (2022), an alternate future in which a second German landing attempt succeeds in 1941.
- Resistance (2011), a film about a group of rural Welsh partisans opposing the occupation of Great Britain.
- Went the Day Well? (1942) is centred on a German radar-jamming mission for Sea Lion being eventually repulsed by the efforts of the civilian population of a remote village.

== Television ==
- An Englishman's Castle (1978) is a British series set in an alternate history 1970s, in which Germany won World War II and occupies England. The protagonist Peter Ingram is a writer for a soap opera (also called An Englishman's Castle), which is set in London during The Blitz and subsequent German occupation.
- SS-GB (2017), a five-part adaption of the Deighton novel.

== Video games ==
- Axis & Allies (2004), while playing as the Axis powers in campaign mode (which has the Axis powers winning the war), Operation Sea Lion is the mission following the failed invasion of Normandy.
- Battle Academy: Operation Sealion (2012), a DLC campaign for a turn-based strategy game.
- Empire Earth (2001), the last mission of the German campaign is to carry out Operation Sea Lion.
- Hearts of Iron IV (2016), as an achievement for occupying the whole of Great Britain.
- Turning Point: Fall of Liberty (2008), a first-person shooter.
- War Front: Turning Point (2007), a real-time strategy game.
- We Happy Few (2018), a survival game set in an alternate mid-1960s England after the successful occupation of the country by Nazi Germany.
- Call of Duty: WWII (2017), a first-person shooter game. Operation Sea Lion is referenced in the Nazi Zombies mode.

== See also ==
- Hypothetical Axis victory in World War II
