= Hypothetical Axis victory in World War II =

Alternate history scenario

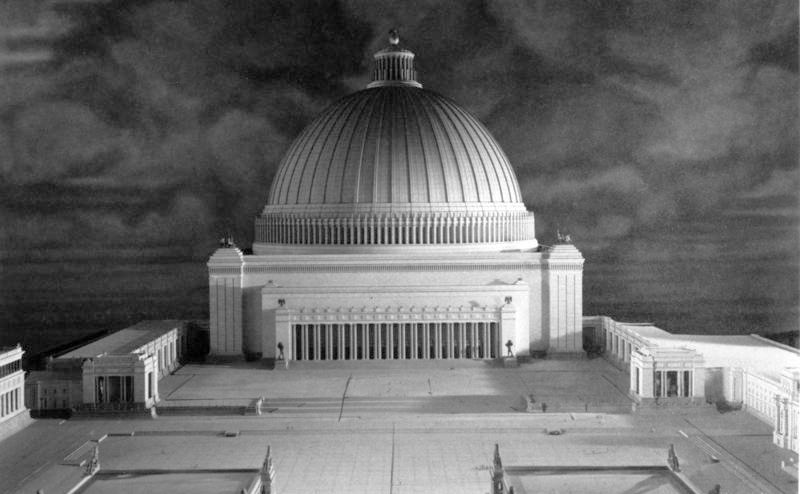
Model of the Volkshalle in World Capital Germania, part of Adolf Hitler's vision for the future of Nazi Germany after the planned victory in World War II.

A military victory of the Axis powers over the Allies of the Second World War (1939–1945) is a popular topic in the alternate history subgenre of speculative fiction and in scholarly works that discuss the possible alternative path of history. Works of alternative history (fiction) and of counterfactual history (non-fiction) include stories, novels, performances, and mixed media that often explore speculative public and private life in lands conquered by the coalition, whose principal powers were Nazi Germany, Imperial Japan, and Fascist Italy.

The first work of the genre was Swastika Night (1937), by Katherine Burdekin, a British novel published before Nazi Germany launched World War II in 1939. Later novels of alternative history include The Man in the High Castle (1962) by Philip K. Dick, The Ultimate Solution (1973) by Eric Norden, SS-GB (1978) by Len Deighton, The Divide (1980) by William Overgard, and Fatherland (1992) by Robert Harris. The stories deal with the politics, culture, and personalities who would have allowed the fascist victories against democracy and with the psychology of daily life in totalitarian societies. The novels present stories of how ordinary citizens would have dealt with fascist military occupation and with the resentments of being under colonial domination.

This subgenre usually focuses on Nazi Germany's supremacy over Great Britain and/or the United States, although The Ultimate Solution, The Man in the High Castle and The Divide all provide some description of life in the Japanese Empire's domination over the Pacific Northwest coast of the former United States. In both The Ultimate Solution and The Man in the High Castle, there is a cold war between the two estranged Axis partners, similar to the real animosity between the United States and the Soviet Union. The most detailed discussion of the Japanese Empire's coeval ascendancy is in The Man in the High Castle within the occupied Pacific States of America. The short story "Two Dooms" (1958) by Cyril Kornbluth also more actively explores the Japanese presence in the defeated and occupied United States. In The Man in the High Castle, Fascist Italy is relegated to a distant and dependent third place, with derisive mention of its "African empire."

The term Pax Germanica was applied to the hypothetical Imperial German victory in the First World War (1914–1918). The concept is derived from that of Pax Romana and follows the trend of historians coining variants of the term to describe other periods of relative peace, whether established or attempted, such as Pax Americana, Pax Britannica and Pax Sovietica (see pax imperia).

Academics such as Gavriel David Rosenfeld in The World Hitler Never Made: Alternate History and the Memory of Nazism (2005), have researched the media representations of 'Nazi victory'.

== Depictions of the Axis powers ==
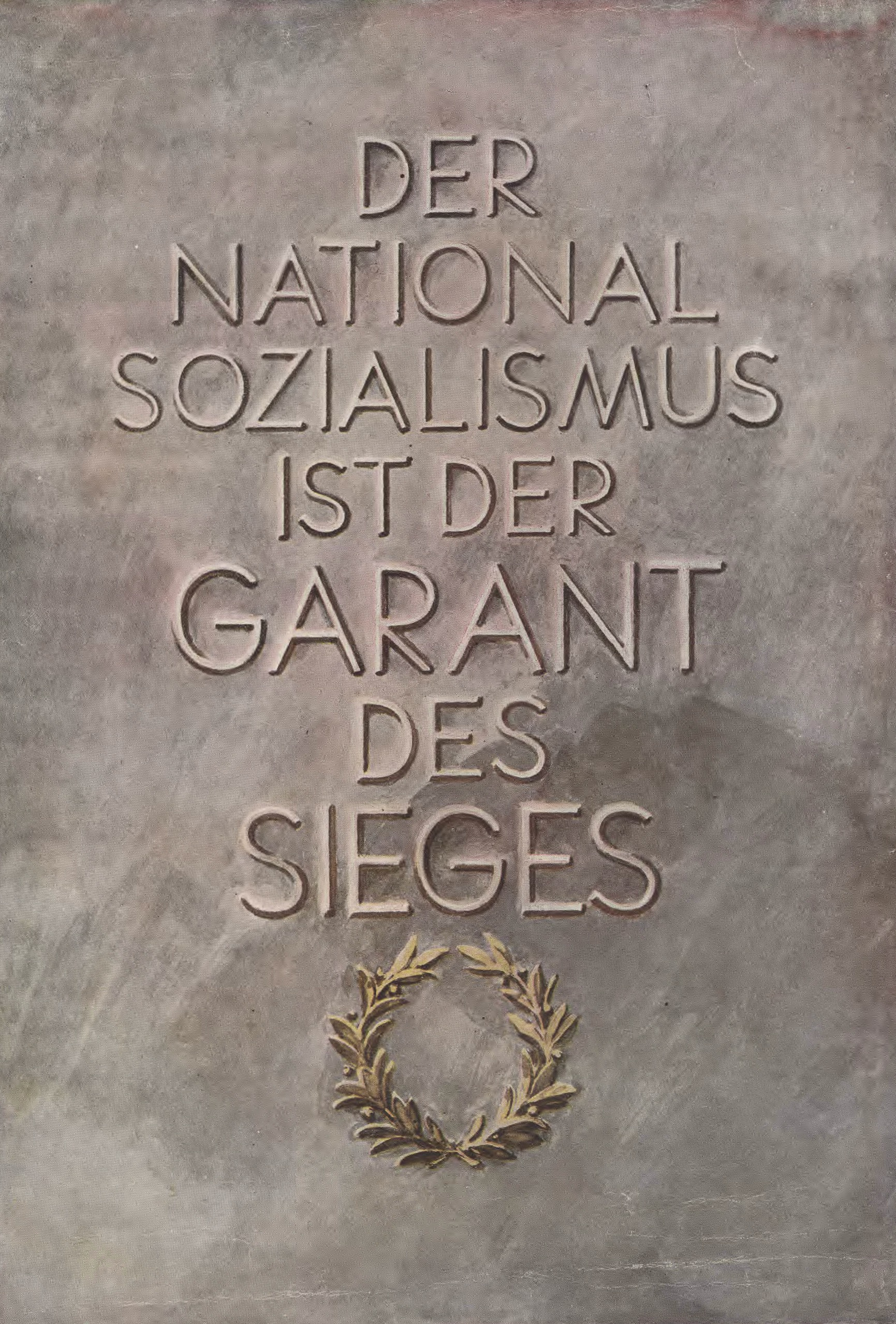
Wochenspruch der NSDAP 26 January 1941 claims that "National Socialism is the guarantor of victory".

=== Themes ===
Helen White stated that a hypothetical world in which Nazi Germany won the Second World War is a harsher and grimmer place to live in than the real world, where Nazi Germany and the Axis Powers lost the War in 1945. Speculative literature about hypothetical military victories by the Axis Powers have generally been English-language literary work from the British Commonwealth and the United States as such protagonists tend to experience events from the perspective of military defeat and foreign military occupation.

The literary tone of alternative history fiction presents the military victory of the Axis Powers as a melancholy background against which the reader sees the unfolding of political plots in a socially strained atmosphere of foreign occupation and socio-economic domination.

The social story of SS-GB (1978) by Len Deighton concludes with a US commando raid into Nazi-occupied Great Britain to rescue British nuclear scientists, while the British Resistance remains hopeful of eventual military liberation by the United States. In Clash of Eagles (1990), by Leo Rutman, the people of New York City rebel against the Nazi occupation of the US.

Some depictions focus on Nazism's contradictions, suggesting that even with military triumph, the system would eventually start to collapse under its own weight. In Fatherland (1992), by Robert Harris, the Greater German Reich faces economic crisis, forcing Hitler to pursue rapprochement with the US; at the story's conclusion, the protagonists thwart this effort by exposing the Holocaust to the American people. Harry Turtledove's In the Presence of Mine Enemies (2003) presents the Nazi world two generations after their victory in WWII, in a time and place that allowed political liberalization and democratization. The Hearts of Iron IV mod The New Order: Last Days of Europe shows the Reich declining thanks to economic stagnation and hostile relations with its former allies. Another example can be found in Wolfenstein: Youngblood's plot, set in an alternative 1980s; high-ranking SS generals are seeking to establish a Fourth Reich to replace the unstable and corrupt Reich after it lost most of its power due to the liberation of America and the demise of Nazi leaders such as the fictional Deathshead and Frau Engel, as well as Hitler himself, in the 1960s.

=== Early depictions ===
The novel Swastika Night (1937) presents the post-war world born from the victory of the Axis Powers: a dictatorship characterized by much "violence and mindlessness" which are justified by "irrationality and superstition". Published two years before Nazi Germany began the Second World War in 1939, Swastika Night is a work of future history and not a work of alternative history. The book reviewer, Darragh McManus, said that although the story and plot of the novel are "a huge leap of imagination, Swastika Night posits a terrifyingly coherent and plausible [world]", that "considering when it was published, and how little of what we know of the Nazi regime today was then understood, the novel is eerily prophetic and perceptive about the nature of Nazism".

The short story I, James Blunt (1941) is a work of wartime propaganda set in a fictional September 1944 when Great Britain is under Nazi rule. The story is told through the entries of a diary, which describe the social and economic consequences of military occupation such as British workers sent to the shipyards of Nazi Germany and Scotland to build warships to attack the U.S. The short story concludes with the diarist exhorting the reader to ensure that the story of the Nazi occupation of Great Britain remains fiction.

On 19 February 1942, the Canadian government staged a simulated Nazi German invasion and occupation of the city of Winnipeg, Manitoba, and surrounding areas known as If Day (French: Si un jour, lit. 'If one day'). It was organized as a war bond promotion by the Greater Winnipeg Victory Loan organization. The event was the largest military exercise in Winnipeg to that point. Organizers believed that the fear induced by the event would help increase fundraising objectives. Activities included a staged firefight between Canadian troops and volunteers dressed as German soldiers, the internment of prominent politicians, the imposition of Nazi rule, a fly-over, and a parade. The event was a success and over $3 million was collected in Winnipeg on that day.

The novel We, Adolf I (1945) presents a Nazi victory in the Battle of Stalingrad which allowed Hitler to crown himself emperor of the world. In Berlin, the Nazis build an imperial palace featuring architectural elements of the Eiffel Tower and the Statue of Liberty. In the course of the story, the despot Hitler enters a dynastic marriage with the Japanese Imperial princess in an effort to produce a Fascist heir to rule the world after Hitler.

The 1946 novel The Last Jew (Hebrew: היהודי האחרון, romanized: Ha-Yehudi Ha'Aharon) by Jacob Weinshal tells the alternative history of a Nazi world ruled by the League of Dictators. The League of Dictators plan the public execution of the last Jew as entertainment during the Olympic Games. Before they can realize the spectacular death of the last Jew, the Moon's excessive proximity to Earth, a negative consequence of Nazi lunar colonization, provokes a catastrophe that extinguishes life on planet Earth.

The stage play Peace in Our Time (1947) by Noël Coward explores the nature of fascist rule in London and examines the deleterious effects of military occupation upon the mental health of the common man and the common woman. As a playwright, Coward was included in the Gestapo's Black Book of enemies-of-the-state to be arrested upon completion of Operation Sea Lion, the Nazi conquest of Great Britain.

The novel The Man in the High Castle (1962) presents an Axis victory after Franklin D. Roosevelt is assassinated in 1933 and the United States is divided between Nazi Germany and Imperial Japan.

=== Later depictions ===
Additional notable depictions of Axis victory include:

==== Literature ====
- The Sound of His Horn by Sarban (1952)
- Living Space by Isaac Asimov (1956)
- The Big Time by Fritz Leiber (1957)
- Two Dooms by C. M. Kornbluth (1958)
- The Man in the High Castle by Philip K. Dick (1962)
- Wenn das der Führer wüsste (Titled The Twilight Men in English) by Otto Basil (1966)
- The Iron Dream by Norman Spinrad (1972) depicts a science fiction/fantasy allegory of a Nazi victory
- The Ultimate Solution by Erik Nordsen (1973)
- SS-GB by Len Deighton (1978)
- The Divide by William Overgard (1980)
- The Proteus Operation by James P. Hogan (1985)
- Thor Meets Captain America by David Brin (1986)
- Moon of Ice by Brad Linaweaver (1988)
- The Last Article by Harry Turtledove (1988)
- Clash of Eagles by Leo Rutman (1990)
- Timewyrm: Exodus (Doctor Who novel) by Terrance Dicks (1991)
- Fatherland by Robert Harris (1992)
- No Retreat by John Bowen (1994)
- '48 by James Herbert (1996)
- Making History by Stephen Fry (1996)
- Patton's Spaceship by John Barnes (part of The Timeline Wars series [1997])
- The works of Peter G. Tsouras:
  - Hitler Triumphant: Alternate Decisions of World War II (1999)
  - Third Reich Victorious: Alternate Decisions of World War II (2002)
  - Rising Sun Victorious: The Alternative History of How the Japanese Won the Pacific War (2007)
- Against the Day by Michael Cronin (1999)
- After Dachau by Daniel Quinn (2001)
- Collaborator by Murray Davies (2003)
- In the Presence of Mine Enemies by Harry Turtledove (2003, the first 21 pages were originally a short story published in 1992)
- The Leader by Guy Walters (2003)
- Mobius Dick by Andrew Crumey (2004)
- The Plot Against America by Philip Roth (2004)
- Warlords of Utopia by Lance Parkin (2004)
- Farthing, Ha'penny, and Half a Crown, series by Jo Walton (2006–2008)
- Resistance by Owen Sheers (2007)
- The Conquistador's Hat by John Maddox Roberts (2011)
- Dominion by C. J. Sansom (2012)
- A Kill in the Morning by Graeme Shimmin (2014)
- The Afrika Reich and The Madagaskar Plan by Guy Saville (2011–2015)
- Mecha Samurai Empire series by Peter Tieryas (2016–2020)

Counterfactual scenarios are also written as a form of academic paper rather than necessarily as fiction and/or novel-length fiction:

- What If?: The World's Foremost Military Historians Imagine What Might Have Been contains "How Hitler Could Have Won the War" by John Keegan.
- Virtual History: Alternatives and Counterfactuals, edited by Niall Ferguson, contains "Hitler's England: What if Germany had invaded Britain in May 1940?" by Andrew Roberts and Niall Ferguson, and "Nazi Europe: What if Nazi Germany had defeated the Soviet Union?" by Michael Burleigh.
- If the Allies Had Fallen: Sixty Alternate Scenarios of World War II by Dennis Showalter.

In the All About History Bookazine series, What if...Book of Alternate History (2019): Among the articles are What if...Germany had won the Battle of Britain? and What if...The Allies had lost the Battle of the Atlantic?

==== Film ====
- It Happened Here (1966), a British film directed by Kevin Brownlow
- Philadelphia Experiment II (1993)
- Fatherland (1994), based on the 1992 novel
- Jackboots on Whitehall (2010)
- Resistance (2011)

==== Television ====
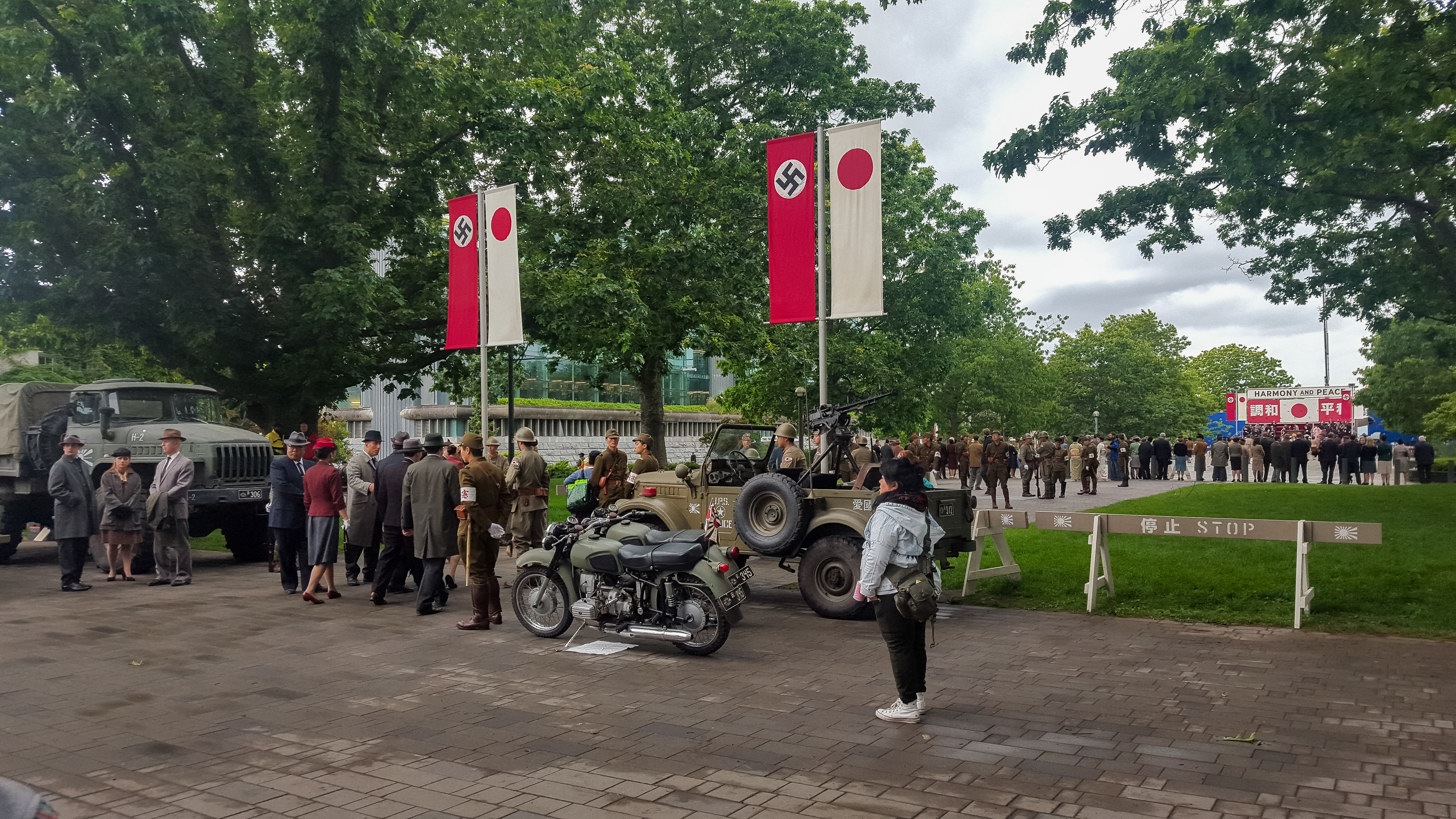
A film set in Vancouver, Canada, used for the 2015 alternate history television series The Man in the High Castle; the occupation of major Allied cities by Axis powers is commonly depicted in works about a hypothetical Axis victory.

- The Other Man (1964)
- Star Trek: The Original Series: "The City on the Edge of Forever" (1967)
- Doctor Who: "Inferno" (1970)
- An Englishman's Castle (1978)
- Darkroom: "Stay Tuned, We'll Be Right Back" (1981)
- Justice League: "The Savage Time" (2002)
- Star Trek: Enterprise: "Zero Hour" / "Storm Front" (2004)
- Misfits: Season 3, Episode 4 (2011)
- The Man in the High Castle (2015–2019), an Amazon Studios series based on the 1962 novel
- Danger 5: "Welcome to Hitlerland" (2015)
- Hulk and the Agents of S.M.A.S.H.: "Days of Future Smash, Part 4 - The Hydra Years" (2015)
- SS-GB (2017), a BBC miniseries based on the 1978 novel
- Crisis on Earth-X (2017), a four-part Arrowverse crossover event between Supergirl, Arrow, The Flash, and Legends of Tomorrow
- The Plot Against America (miniseries) (2020) based on the 2004 novel
- Peacemaker: "Ignorance Is Chris" / "Like a Keith in the Night" (2025)

==== Comics ====
- "Blitzkrieg 1972", issue 155 of The Incredible Hulk (September 1972) depicts an alternate timeline where Nazis led by Captain Axis are attempting to invade New York City and battle an outnumbered U.S. Army assisted by the Hulk.
- The 1988 manga Kerberos Panzer Cop and related media in Mamoru Oshii's Kerberos saga depict an alternate universe where Nazi Germany develops "Protect Gear" powered exoskeletons early into the war, defeating the Allies and managing to occupy the Empire of Japan (part of the Allies in the saga's timeline). However, the 20 July plot succeeds, and the regime succeeding Hitler purges Nazism from the German Reich and restores the Weimar Republic, though authoritarianism is suggested to remain the dominant ideology.
- In the 2003–2004 Captain America story arc Cap Lives (Captain America Vol. 4, issues 17–20), Captain America awakens from suspended animation in 1964 to find that, due to a temporal anomaly, Nazi Germany has won World War II and conquered much of the world, including the United States. After dropping a nuclear bomb on the U.S., Nazi Germany took control of North America, renaming New York City as "New Berlin" and declaring it the capital of Nazi America. Alongside American resistance fighters, Captain America fights against the New Reich and succeeds in returning to the timeline in which he is originally meant to be.
- In DC Comics, Earth-X is an alternative Earth in which the Nazis developed the atomic bomb before the U.S. and won World War II.
- In the A-Next comic series by Marvel Comics, an alternate reality designated as Earth-9907 is depicted, in which the Red Skull survived and assumed leadership of the failing Third Reich, leading it into total world domination.
- The 2003 graphic novel The Life Eaters is an adaptation and expansion of Thor Meets Captain America.

==== Video games ====
- Rocket Ranger (as a background story/alternate reality) by Cinemaware (1988)
- Mortyr by Mirage Media (1999)
- Turning Point: Fall of Liberty by Spark Unlimited (2008)
- Battlestations: Pacific by Eidos Interactive (2009)
- Wolfenstein: The New Order by MachineGames (2014)
  - Wolfenstein: The Old Blood (2015)
  - Wolfenstein II: The New Colossus (2017)
  - Wolfenstein: Youngblood (2019)
  - Wolfenstein: Cyberpilot (2019)
- Among the many alternate history timelines featured in the GURPS role-playing game Infinite Worlds is the highly dangerous timeline known as Reich-5, the worst of several Nazi-victorious alternate histories.
- Many conversion mods set in a world with an Axis victory have been created for the grand strategy wargame Hearts of Iron IV by Paradox Interactive.
  - The New Order: Last Days of Europe (abbreviated as TNO), a mod for Hearts of Iron IV taking place after the Axis Powers won World War II where an alternate three-way Cold War is after World War II, where the Axis powers, defeat the Soviet Union led by Bukharin and Invade United Kingdom during the 1945 Operation Sea Lion. And in a German-Japanese Nuclear attack, Destroy Pearl Harbor, and United States, Conditionally Surrenders Pearl Harbor, thus winning World War II. thus sparking a American-German-Japanese Cold War, Between Organization of Free Nations, Einheitspakt and Greater East Asia Co-Prosperity Sphere. Notably TNO after deleting Ordensstaat Burgund, Globalplans, Caused a split between 2WRW Mod Team. thus them forming The New Order: Requiem, and a few years earlier, after the Toolbox Theory update, removing Atlantropa from the mod, making them form The New Order: Rises Again
  - Thousand Week Reich, presents a German victory in World War II. In its timeline, the Germans capture the British Expeditionary Force at Dunkirk coupled with a collapse in public morale after the fall of France and the seemingly unending aerial war over the Battle of Britain, causes the British to sign an armistice with Germany in early 1941. Germany then is able to conquer the western portion of the Soviet Union following a long conflict. The Allies (at peace with Germany) are able to win against Japan in the Pacific. The mod begins with a Cold War between the United States, Germany and India in 1952.

== Hypothetical German victory in World War I ==
A similar but less frequent theme are alternate histories describing a hypothetical victory of Imperial Germany in World War I.

The first of this kind was When William Came (full name: When William Came: A Story of London Under the Hohenzollerns) written by British author Saki (the pseudonym of Hector Hugh Munro) and published in November 1913, thus at the time a future history rather than alternate history. Correctly predicting a war between Britain and Germany (in which Saki himself would be killed), the book assumes that Germany would win and impose a harsh occupation regime on the defeated Britain.

A much later example is Harry Turtledove's Curious Notions, describing a world dominated into the late 21st Century by the descendants of Kaiser Wilhelm II, who promote monarchies everywhere and preserve Austria-Hungary and the Ottoman Empire as German satellites. In the book, the people of the occupied United States, like the rest of the world, are harshly oppressed by an omnipresent German secret police, similar to the role of the Gestapo in Nazi victory scenarios, but without the influence of Nazi ideology.

In the alternate timeline of Keith Laumer's Worlds of the Imperium, Imperial Germany won the First World War but failed to consolidate its victory, with a chaotic and highly destructive war, and eventually, a nuclear war, continuing to sweep the planet for generations.

Philip José Farmer's The Gate of Time mentions, but does not describe in detail, an alternate timeline in which Kaiser Wilhelm IV (rather than Adolf Hitler) controls an expansionist, imperialist Germany in this world's Second World War.

The alternate history mod Kaiserreich, Legacy of the Weltkrieg of the video game Hearts of Iron IV also covers a world where Germany won World War I, as the United States never joins the Entente. Causing Germany to gain territory in Central Africa and Eastern Europe, securing their gains under the Reichspakt military alliance and the Mitteleuropa economic alliance. The British and French mainlands were taken over by syndicalist revolutionaries, while their governments remain in exile in Canada and Algeria respectively. Italy is divided between a syndicalist government in the north, the Two Sicilies in the south, the Papal State in Rome, and the Austrian-supported Italian Republic in Lombardy and Venetia. Austria-Hungary and the Ottoman Empire survive the war and Bulgaria gains territory from Serbia, Greece, and Romania. The Russian Civil War still occurs, but ends in the victory of the White movement. The United States continues to be in an economic depression by 1936, and will eventually fall into a four way civil war between syndicalists under John Reed, a military junta of the federal government under Douglas MacArthur, a longist government under Huey Long, and the Pacific states under many different leaders.

== See also ==
- Nazism in the Americas
- If Day
- Kantokuen
- Operation Sea Lion in fiction
- Proposed Japanese invasion of Australia during World War II
- Palestine Final Fortress (possible Nazi occupation of Palestine)
- Axis powers negotiations on the division of Asia
- Ural Mountains in Nazi planning
- Generalplan Ost
- Axis powers
- Lightning in the Night – 1940 speculative fiction
