= In the Presence of Mine Enemies =

2003 alternate history novel by Harry Turtledove

- Author: Harry Turtledove
- Language: English
- Genre: Alternate history
- Publisher: New American Library
- Publication date: November 4, 2003
- Publication place: United States
- Media type: Print (hardback & paperback)
- Pages: 464 pages
- ISBN: 0-451-52902-2
- OCLC: 52030530
- Dewey Decimal: 813/.54 21
- LC Class: PS3570.U76 I54 2003

In the Presence of Mine Enemies is a 2003 alternate history novel by American author Harry Turtledove, expanded from the eponymous short story. The title comes from Psalm 23:5. The novel depicts a world in which the United States remained isolationist and so did not participate in the Second World War, thus allowing a victory to the Axis powers, which divided the world. However, some years after the war, the Third World War occurred and featured the Axis powers defeating the United States and Canada.

Set in 2010, the novel focuses on Heinrich Gimpel and a small group of Jews who survived the Holocaust by passing as Gentiles; all the book's viewpoint characters are members of this secret Jewish group. The events occur against a backdrop that parallels the Soviet Union's last days, with characters based upon Mikhail Gorbachev, Boris Yeltsin, and others.

== Plot summary ==
Wehrmacht officer Heinrich Gimpel astonishes his 10-year-old daughter, Alicia, with a secret that has been hidden from her all her life: the family is Jewish. He explains that the Gimpels, their friends Walther and Esther Stutzman, and their extended families all belong to the remnants of Jews who now survive by hiding in plain sight within the very society that wants them dead. Now old enough, by family tradition, to be trusted with this life-or-death deception, Alicia is obliged to hide the truth from her friends, her classmates, and even her younger sisters, even as she is forced to regard her school's racist curriculum from a new perspective that leaves her sick and angry over all the antisemitic propaganda that she had always learned and parroted without question.

Meanwhile, Heinrich finds himself caught in the marital strife between his co-worker, Willi Dorsch, and Willi's wife, Erika. Willi, doubting Erika's fidelity due to her constant flirting with Heinrich, begins an extra-marital affair with his secretary. Embittered by her husband's infidelity, Erika seeks to have a retaliatory affair with Heinrich. He resists, which leads to Erika accusing him of being a Jew and Heinrich being arrested by the Sicherheitspolizei. It is only after Erika realizes that her accusation caused Heinrich's children to be taken as well that she confesses her lie and attempts to commit suicide, unaware the entire time that Heinrich and his family actually are Jewish.

Esther Stutzman, who works as a receptionist in a doctor's office, also experiences a close call with Nazi policies when her friends Richard and Maria Klein, closeted Jews like herself, bring their ailing eight-month-old baby, Paul, in for a checkup. The diagnosis, Tay–Sachs disease, is a disease known to be prevalent among Jews. A subsequent investigation into his family background would spell doom for his parents and any names that they might be forced to reveal under torture. Although Esther's husband, Walther, is able to hack into the Reich's computer network and change the Klein's family history, it is the revelation that Reichsführer-SS Lothar Prützmann has a nephew with Tay-Sachs that brings the investigation to a halt.

In the background, the death of the current Führer, Kurt Haldweim (modelled on the real-life Austrian president Kurt Waldheim), causes him to be replaced by the reform-minded Heinz Buckliger, who relaxes the oppressive laws of the Reich. In a secret speech, with word-of-mouth spreading it to the populace, the new Führer denounces his predecessors and says that the Reich committed crimes in the past. Reactionary opposition rallies around the SS, and the populist Gauleiter of Berlin, Rolf Stolle, champions accelerated reform.

Things come to a head with the announcement of relatively free elections: candidates need not be Nazi Party members though they must be Aryan. Led by Reichsführer-SS Lothar Prützmann, the SS carries out a conservative coup d'état, imprisons the Führer, and installs former High Commissioner of Ostland Affairs, Odilo Globocnik, as the new Führer. However, Stolle instigates a people power movement, which the Wehrmacht supports. The coup d'état is defeated after Walther Stutzman salts the country's computer network with the information about Reichsführer-SS Prützmann's Tay-Sachs afflicted nephew. Soon, Berlin comes to the conclusion that Prützmann is a Jew, which definitively turns the tide against the coup. In the aftermath, Prützmann kills himself, Globocnik is lynched, and Buckliger is re-enstated as Führer (albeit harrowed by his detainment and eclipsed by the popular Stolle).

At the end of the novel, elections deliver a pro-reform majority to the Reichstag, with Stolle as its speaker, and produces a mandate for the independence of the Protectorate of Bohemia and Moravia in a concurrent referendum. Also, the Gimpels and the Stutzmans gather to tell the ten-year-old Francesca that she is a Jew.

== Viewpoint characters ==
- Heinrich Gimpel, a hidden Jew serving as an officer at the Oberkommando der Wehrmacht in Berlin. Heinrich is careful and meticulous about maintaining his masquerade and originally even from the reader, who does not before nearly a whole chapter learn that Gimpel is a hidden Jew and a leader of a secret Jewish community. Heinrich's specific job is to monitor the American payment of tribute to Germany and to detect the frequent attempts to avoid payment. Gimpel is arrested because a friend's wife denounces him as a Jew although she did not know that he really is one after he resisted her sexual advances. Gimpel is eventually released from custody, with an SS major who escorts him out the door casually remarking to him: "You find us in the oddest places."
- Lise Gimpel, Heinrich's wife, also a Jew.
- Alicia Gimpel, Heinrich and Lise's ten-year-old daughter and oldest of three sisters. At the beginning of the book, she is initiated into the secret that she and other family and friends are Jewish. She is stunned but gradually comes to accept it.
- Susanna Weiss, a Medieval English scholar at the Friedrich Wilhelm University. She is also one of the few surviving Jews left in the Reich.
- Esther Stutzman, a receptionist at a Berlin area pediatrician's office. She and her husband, Walther, are also hidden Jews. She is a tuckerization of the well-known science-fiction/fantasy author Esther Friesner.
- Walther Stutzman, a computer programmer at Zeiss. He has unauthorized access into many of the Reich's databases using codes created by his father, who was involved with transferral of paper records to computer records. He can assign false Aryan pedigrees to Jewish people to allow them to avoid detection by the Reich.

== Setting ==
=== World politics and geography ===
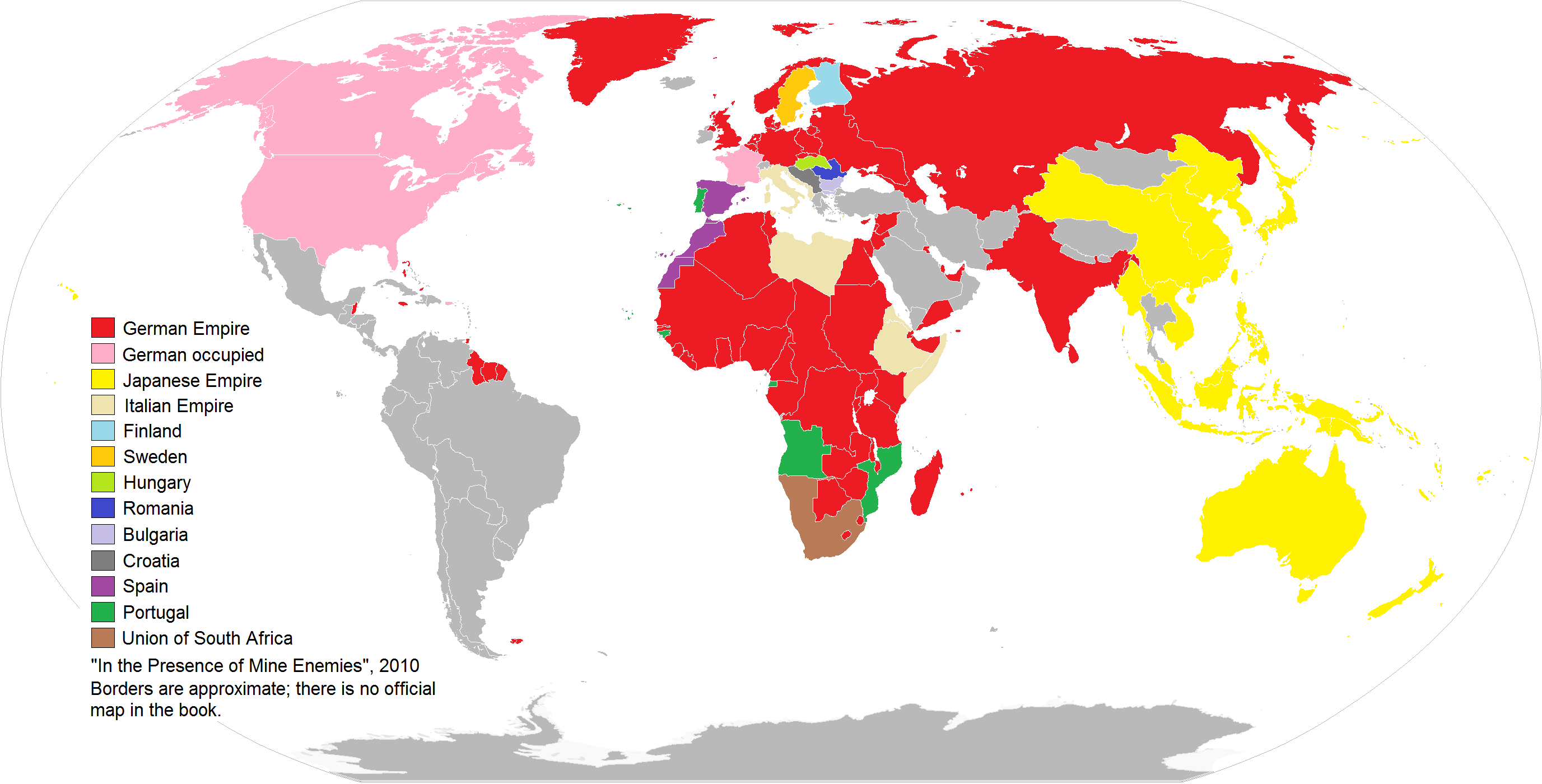
A map showing the world's borders as described throughout the book.

==== Political alignment ====
The Führer of the Greater German Reich is the world's most powerful political leader. Besides the Reich itself, the "Greater Germanic Empire" includes countries that are occupied (but not annexed) and others that are allied. The occupied countries have their own governments but limited sovereignty; the Nazis interfere in their internal affairs, especially in applying racial ideology. The allies, though technically independent, are subject to heavy Nazi influence; most of them represent the local varieties of racist, fascist, and radical nationalist forces.

Italy's empire is around the Mediterranean Sea, including the parts of Africa granted by the Reich. The Nazis compel the Italians to carry out large-scale massacres of Arabs in their territories in the Middle East. The nation is controlled by the House of Savoy (headed by King Umberto) and the Duce of the Italian Empire. While much of Africa is divided up among Germany, Italy, Spain, and Portugal, an "Aryan-dominated" Union of South Africa remains as an independent ally of the German Reich. Spain is mentioned as being governed by a caudillo, but no mention is made about the status of the Spanish monarchy.

Although it is less powerful than Germany, Imperial Japan is a nuclear power that keeps the Reich at bay with the implicit threat of mutually assured destruction. Moreover, Japan has its own subordinate rulers (only the Emperor of Manchukuo is mentioned) in the Greater East Asia Co-Prosperity Sphere. Despite having "an ocean of slave labor" at its disposal, Japan now concentrates upon developing high technologies. Despite the Germano–Nipponese alliance, the Nazis consider the Japanese to be racially inferior and lacking in creativity, using propaganda pointing to a perceived decrease in Japan's technological advances as proof. Even so, Japanese tourists, students and restaurants are commonly seen within the Reich.

==== United States and Canada ====
In the 1960s and the 1970s, Germany and the Axis powers defeated the United States and Canada in the Third World War with the nuclear bombs that they had developed. The key American cities of Washington, DC and Philadelphia were destroyed by the bombs, with their environments being rendered uninhabitable for years to come. Other cities such as New York City, St. Louis, and Chicago were heavily damaged by conventional bombing raids. The US capital was moved to Omaha, Nebraska, where a pro-Nazi puppet government was set up, and the Reich maintains Wehrmacht occupation forces in New York City, Chicago, St. Louis, and Omaha itself. Upon conquering the US, the Einsatzkommandos and the American white supremacists systematically kill the country's Jewish and most of its Black populations, with any remaining Black people being used for slave labor by the Reich.

The US pays annual tribute, an important income for Germany's economy, despite US hyperinflation and the US dollar's disappearance as a world currency. Whenever possible, the US evades paying the tribute.

==== Other occupied nations ====
Henry IX is the reigning monarch of the United Kingdom (although his lineage is never explained), which has been annexed by the Reich. The British Union of Fascists is the governing party, with Charlie Lynton as Prime Minister; however, it is internally divided over the extent of the Reich's influence in its governance (reminiscent of British euroscepticism) and the selection process for a new Führer.

The Poles, Russians, Ukrainians, Estonians, Latvians, Lithuanians, and Serbs are killed because they are Untermenschen, and the Arabs for being as "Semitic as Jews." Moreover, the Reich, Italian Empire, Portugal, and Spain commit the genocide of the African populations and enslave survivors. South Africa, however, still continues its apartheid and so ironically keeps the Black South Africans from being either killed off or used for slave labor.

Any Jews found are immediately killed on sight, and while "the surviving Russians were pushed far east of the Urals," there is much guerrilla fighting, which requires forts to protect the German settlers.

The Nazis treat the Czechs, Croats, and Bulgarians relatively well, despite being Slavs: the Czechs greatly contribute to the Reich's economy, and the Croats and Bulgarians savagely persecute the Serbs by severe racial discrimination, suppressing rebellions, and enslavement or killing of dissidents. Iranians and Indians are classified as "Aryan" and so are not persecuted by the Nazis; some are even invited to study at German universities.

=== Technology ===
The level of technology in the novel is much the same as in the actual 21st century. The Wehrmacht uses jet aircraft, panzers, U-boats, armoured personnel carriers, assault rifles, and a variety of naval warships. The "Ministry of Air and Space" is mentioned as having planted a permanent outpost on the Moon and to be carrying out a human landing on Mars, and it may be planning a crewed mission to the Jovian moons. Orbital weather platforms are also mentioned in the novel.

Civilian technology has also advanced similarly to its military counterpart in the 21st century. Jet airliners, televisions (called televisors), computers (although the Internet has not reached the same level as its real-life counterpart for fear of it being a "security nightmare"), modern cars, microwaves, and dishwashers are used throughout the Reich. The German population enjoys very high living standards at the expense of non-Germans throughout the Reich and occupied nations.

=== Society ===
The Reich's society is culturally dominant because of its victories in the Second and the Third World Wars, and German companies and organizations dominate the economies of the allied and occupied nations. Mercedes-Benz and Volkswagen are thriving, and Zeiss produces the Reich's computers and software. Agfa-Gevaert produces television commercials that encourage Germans to migrate to the Ostland territories, and Lufthansa covers the air.

The British Broadcasting Corporation is mentioned throughout the novel, with the Reich's counterpart being the Reichs-Rundfunk-Gesellschaft (RRG). A RRG newscaster, Horst Witzleben, appears several times in the novel, and his "Seven O'clock News" is highly influential.

The Reich Genealogical Office has online genealogical records, which can define life and death to persons suspected of being Jewish. (In real-life, the Nazi state already used the punchcards developed by IBM to mark out the Jews and eventually arrest them and send them to extermination camps.)

==== Economy ====
The Reichsmark is the dominant world currency and is legal tender in the Greater German Reich, but most of the Reich's member states, territories, and allies (including the Empire of Japan, Latin America, Britain, and the United States) have national currencies. Since the Reich dictates favorable exchange rates, the Reichsmark is readily accepted (and apparently welcome) even in places in which it is not legal tender. Britain continues to use its pre-decimal pound sterling currency, but the five-shilling Crown coin is struck in cheap aluminum, not silver, as "silver" coins were at least partly made of before World War II and briefly afterward.

==== Education ====
School is the way with which the German Reich indoctrinates and controls the citizenry, starting in its youth. Corporal punishment is practiced in schools against actions such as disrespecting a superior, not doing one's school work, and for not knowing the correct answers to teachers' questions in the classroom. The school year occupies most of the calendar year, with the only major holidays being the two-week holiday between Christmas and the New Year, and the week-long break after Easter. The remainder of the year is school work though one-day holidays occur infrequently.

The Hitlerjugend and Bund Deutscher Mädel are compulsory for children in the German Reich, the Nazi gender roles having changed little. At the end of the novel, the Hitlerjugend implements changes towards preparing boys into becoming responsible, adult citizens, rather than army conscripts.

The Reich education system is only for Germany; allied states and occupied territories control their own education systems. In the US, American children continue to have long summer holidays from school, a fact that German teachers emphasize as one of the reasons for its defeat to the German Reich.

German academics have key roles in the processes of racial discrimination and genocide. The German Institute for Racial Studies, part of Friedrich Wilhelm University, is charged with defining the peoples and ethnic groups of the "Germanic Empire" that are subhuman and so are marked for genocide or slavery. At its side, as the smiling face of the Reich, is the German Institute for Foreigners (founded in 1922), charged with instructing those foreigners who fortunately were classed as "Aryans", such as Iranians and Indians, in the German language and culture.

Academic life is male-dominated. Although it is possible for a woman to have an academic career, the few who do so face great difficulties and must engage in daily, petty struggles to gain privileges that are granted to men. Under Reich sexism, an assertive woman might be accused that she is "not a proper National Socialist woman," but such attitudes are regarded as old-fashioned and challenged by younger people.

==== Sports ====
The Reich's sports are the sole province of the Aryans and are controlled by the German Federation of Sport, which favors German sportsmen over sportsmen from other states. It has the power to reserve the right to withdraw from competition with foreign teams and to withhold the rights of foreign teams to tour the Reich when political relations sour. An example is the boycott of Italian sports teams after a riot at a football match in Milan between the home team's fans and the visiting Leipzig team's fans. The deprivation of the right to tour the Reich and of having the Reich's teams visit is financially hurtful. Germany won a recent World Cup but now is challenged by a powerful, multi-racial Brazil, with Negroes and Native Americans, among others.

==== Surviving Jews ====
Although the Jews are considered to be exterminated in 2010, antisemitic stereotypes remain strong in popular culture and official propaganda and are an important part of school education. The books of antisemitic author Julius Streicher (Trust No Fox in the Green Meadow, No Jew on His Oath, and The Poison Mushroom) are universal reading for German children. The hidden Jews feel obliged to buy them for their children since doing otherwise might arouse suspicion.

Jews both are and are not of the society surrounding them. They must constantly play the role of parroting the prevailing antisemitic clichés. They keep as much of their Jewish identity as can be imparted in secret meetings among themselves, with purely oral lore though some written Hebrew is taught. With the exception of the Bible, which can be kept openly, since Christianity, while not encouraged, is allowed by the Reich, they dare not possess books on Judaism though they still exist.

All of the viewpoint characters were born under the Nazis, and maintaining the masquerade is second nature. The greatest danger is when a child is told of his or her true identity, usually aged ten, which is considered old enough to keep the secret. Children often are shocked, since like all other German children, they grew up exposed to constant antisemitism from teachers and children's books. The adults soften the shock by teaching the children to feel privileged to belong to such a secret society.

It is mentioned that the hidden Jews regard it as too dangerous to gather on the Major Holidays and fasts of Judaism, such as Passover and Yom Kippur, and so they hold their secret gatherings on Minor Holidays such as Purim.

==== Other minorities ====
German industry uses Slavic, Black, and Arab slave laborers for "dirty" or dangerous work. In one passage, an industrial accident in the Ruhr is reported on television as having caused the deaths of "Twelve Aryans and an unknown number of Untermenschen."

Homosexuals are actively persecuted. Unlike Jews, Gypsies, and other "inferior races," which are thought to have been wiped out" homosexuals continue to arise and are hunted by the security police unless they have political connections to protect them.

=== Locales ===
==== Berlin ====
Much of the story occurs in Berlin. The Reich capital is replete with the monumental architecture of Albert Speer. An important example is the Great Hall, which can house more than 100,000 people and held the funeral of deceased Führer Kurt Haldweim. With a dome 200 m high and 250 m wide, it is crowned with a massive, gilded German eagle holding a swastika.

Nearby is the Führer's Palace, the Führer's official residence, which is guarded by soldiers from the Infantry Regiment Großdeutschland, which is barracked near the Palace. Aside from security, it is a ceremonial, dress corps armed with (antique) Gewehr 98 rifles and an arsenal that includes assault rifles and tanks. Next is the Adolf-Hitler-Platz, a grand public square for rallies and such.

The Soldier's Hall commemorates the German Reich's military might by exhibiting the radioactive remains of the Liberty Bell (displayed behind lead glass), gliders that were used to invade Britain, the first Panzer IV to enter the Kremlin, and the railroad carriage in which Imperial Germany surrendered to the Allies in 1918, at Compiègne, France, and in which France surrendered to Nazi Germany in 1940.

The Arch of Triumph is 170 m wide and 1700 m deep although it is modelled on the smaller Arc de Triomphe in Paris; much of the Berlin district's automobile traffic transits through it. Because the city is populous, public transport (rapid transit trains, U-Bahn, and commuter railroads) is well developed; one rail station is the "South Station," near government offices. Speer's plans cause the anchoring of the south end of the main boulevard with the most monumental structures. Captured enemy weapons and battle wreckage (a British fighter plane, a Soviet tank, a US submarine conning tower) are displayed outside the station.

Berlin also has the headquarters to the key government ministries: Air and Space, Justice, Interior, Transport, Food, Economics, Colonial, the Oberkommando der Wehrmacht, and the Führer's Office.

The Kurfürstendamm is a commercial district that glitters with neon signs and reflected sun light, but the citizens of Berlin use the street's full name in their daily lives, instead of the abbreviated slang of the native. Berlin is culturally vibrant by offering residents and visitors a wildly successful musical on Churchill and Stalin (reminiscent of The Producers) and cosmopolitan cuisines, but under the Reinheitsgebot, the nation's medieval beer-purity law bans the importation of Japanese beer. American fast food is a rarity because of the American economic collapse after it was defeated in World War III, despite the existence of eateries such as The Greasy Spoon.

Culturally, the toy store Ulbright offers "Vicki" dolls and "Landser Sepp" action figures to the Reich's children. Vicki dolls are made in the US using slave labour and come in different varieties, but all dolls look perfectly Aryan and abide to Reich policy.

==== London ====
Parts of the story also take place in London, the capital of Britain. In the novel, the British people are impoverished because of the German occupation. William Shakespeare and his works are more widely known and published in Germany than in his homeland, partly because of Britain's economic collapse. During the war, much of London was destroyed by aerial bombing and fierce urban fighting during the last-ditch resistance by Churchill and his supporters. Key British buildings, including the Parliament building, Big Ben and St Paul's Cathedral, have been completely destroyed, with photographs and paintings being their only remaining legacy. Some areas of the city have been in ruins for over 70 years because of both the harsh reparations imposed on the British by the Germans and the partisan uprisings that were completely crushed only by the mid-1970s. German city planners often visit Britain to see how it deals with building from the clean slate that they can never have.

The Crown is a hotel that serves as the meeting place of the British Union of Fascists; as its name implies, it is dominated by an enormous crown. The BUF's members have a reputation of being violent thugs, and a fight involving its members takes place outside and within the hotel. A second hotel, the Silver Eagle, hosts the Medieval English Association conference and bears a glass and steel eagle on its top. Both hotels are modern, glass-fronted structures.

== Literary criticism and significance ==
Gavriel David Rosenfeld, in his work The World Hitler Never Made, notes that unlike other alternate histories that deal with a Nazi victory, In the Presence of Mine Enemies humanizes the Nazis. Rosenfeld stated that would have been impossible in earlier years, when the trend was to show the Nazis in alternate histories as the "incarnation of evil." Rosenfeld, however, noted that despite Turtledove's reputation as an acclaimed and skilled writer in alternate history, Turtledove received a lot of criticism for the novel, which made Rosenfeld assume that most American audiences do not wish to humanize the Nazis.

Adam-Troy Castro, however, gave a good review of the novel. Though he found that the hidden Jewish characters of the novel weathered their secret life too well and compared others who live secret lives in our society (for example homosexuals) who sometimes have to deal with incidents of self-loathing, alcoholism, drug abuse and even suicide. In the end Castro was thrilled to see at the end of the novel the main characters standing tall against an oppressive government.

== See also ==
- The Man in the High Castle
- Hypothetical Axis victory in World War II
