= Weaver (Baxter novel) =

2008 novel by Stephen Baxter

- First edition
- Author: Stephen Baxter
- Language: English
- Series: Time's Tapestry
- Genre: Alternate history, science fiction
- Publisher: Gollancz
- Publication date: February 2008
- Publication place: United Kingdom
- Media type: Print (Hardcover Paperback)
- Pages: 321
- ISBN: 0-575-08204-6
- OCLC: 174129970
- Preceded by: Navigator

Weaver is an alternate history and science fiction novel by British writer Stephen Baxter. It is the fourth and final novel in his Time's Tapestry quartet, which deals with psionic broadcast of history-altering content within trans-temporal lucid dreams.

== Plot ==
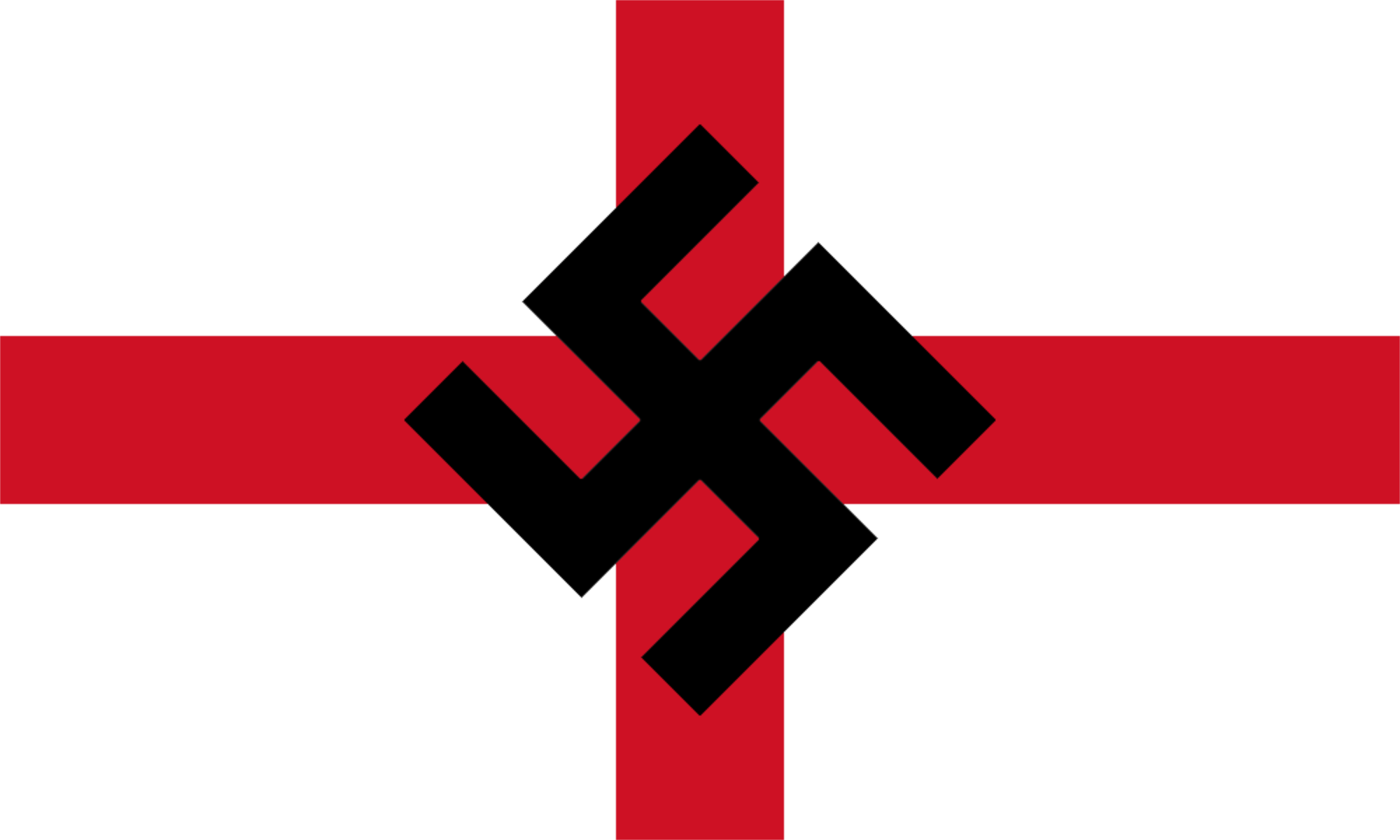
The flag of the Protectorate of Albion.

In Weaver's alternate historical timeline, Adolf Hitler decided to launch Operation Sea Lion (a projected German invasion of the island of Great Britain) in 1940, shortly after a more devastating version of the Dunkirk evacuation caused a shortage of British Army soldiers. However, due to Winston Churchill's lobbying of President Franklin Roosevelt and his Congress, there is some U.S. military assistance provided. As with France during the First World War, there is only partial occupation of South East England, and a Nazi "Protectorate of Albion" (similar to Vichy France) is established. The Nazis occupy a band of territory that stretches from Portsmouth in the southwest, including communities like Tunbridge Wells, Horsham, Hastings, Pevensey, Dover, Folkestone and Gravesend. They establish a puppet regime in Canterbury led by renegade English Nazi collaborator Lord Haw Haw, and while London remains unoccupied, the adjacent occupation results in the evacuation of senior governmental personnel, politicians, King George VI and his royal family to elsewhere in Northern England.

Baxter traces the effects of the occupation on several protagonists. Ben Kamen is Jewish, gay and a latent telepath, while Mary Wooler, and her son Gary, and daughter-in-law Hilda, work on covert projects for the British Army, endeavouring to discover how to dislodge the Nazi presence from the "Protectorate of Albion" in the southeast. Ernst Keiser, a relatively kindly officer, lodges with a rural family, whose female members, Irma and Viv, collaborate intentionally with the military, while Alfie is made to serve in a forced labour unit later in the war.

As in "our" timeline, Hitler still launches Operation Barbarossa against the Soviet Union, but there are other divergences, as the Japanese Empire has sufficient manpower to invade Australia in this timeline as well, although no other details are forthcoming.

Ben's identity is discovered, but he is spared from the ravages of an expanded version of the Holocaust due to his latent telepathic abilities. Julia Fiveash, another English Nazi collaborator, is involved in the Ahnenerbe, an SS occult warfare division. In 1943, the tide of war has turned, and the British and U.S. militaries launch "Operation Walrus" to recover the territory of the former "Protectorate." However, they stumble on Ahnenerbe plans to use Kamen to alter the course of history so that either William the Conqueror lost the Battle of Hastings to Harold II in 1066, or Christopher Columbus turned east, reviving Crusader hostility against the Islamic world during the sixteenth century, instead of his discovery of America. In the ensuing battle, Fiveash kills Gary, and Mary is able to prevent any further historical change through influencing Kamen's choice of telepathic transmissions. However, the novel ends with Kamen once more entering a dream state, and hints that our timeline is the result of his broadcasting a telepathic message to one of Hitler's advisors at the time of the Dunkirk Evacuation.

== Historical, scientific and metaphysical basis ==
In an afterword, Baxter described his influences as Niall Ferguson's book Virtual History (1997), Panzer General Heinz Guderian himself (from his book Panzer Leader (1952), Derek Robinson's Invasion 1940 (2005), and Martin Marix Evans' Invasion! Operation Sea Lion 1940 (2005).

He used Heather Pringle's work on Nazi pseudoscience, The Master Plan: Himmler's Scholars and the Holocaust (2006), Julia Gardner's Wartime Britain 1939-1945 (2004) and Richard Vinen's account of Vichy France, The Unfree French (2006) for details of everyday life under Nazi occupation and British relative wartime rationing stringencies.

He took references from Kurt Gödel's theories about time and parallel universes and his dialogue with the work of Albert Einstein.

Finally, he incorporated J. W. Dunne's concepts about metaphysical "time travel" through dreams. There are also references to fledgeling "calculating engines" (computers), whose actual construction began in Manchester in 1934.

== Sources ==
- Stephen Baxter: Weaver: Time's Tapestry: Book Four: London: Gollancz: 2008: ISBN 978-0-575-07864-2
- Kurt Gödel: "An Example of a New Type of Cosmological Solutions of Einstein's Field Equations of Gravitation" Reviews of Modern Physics (1949): 21: 447–450.

== See also ==
- Emperor
- Conqueror
- Navigator
- Fatherland (novel)
- It Happened Here
- Making History (novel)
- The Man in the High Castle
- SS-GB
- Swastika Night
- Hypothetical Axis victory in World War II
