= The Divide (novel) =

1980 novel by William Overgard

- First edition
- Author: William Overgard
- Language: English
- Genre: Alternate history
- Publisher: Jove Books
- Publication date: 1980
- Publication place: United States

The Divide is a 1980 alternate history novel by William Overgard. It concerns resistance in the United States to a Nazi occupation.

== Plot ==
The point of divergence occurs in 1940 when Nazi Germany forces France and the United Kingdom to surrender and takes control over their former empires. After Germany soon overruns all of the Soviet Union in 1941, both it and Japan attack and invade the United States later that year. President Burton K. Wheeler (who defeated Franklin D. Roosevelt in 1940) surrenders the United States to the Axis after a devastating bombardment of missiles from occupied Canada. The surrender takes place on April 20, 1946, Adolf Hitler's fifty-seventh birthday. President Wheeler, Army Chief of Staff General George Marshall, and other government officials are executed by garrote in a meat packing plant outside of Washington, D.C., on July 24 of the same year (by using the method that was used for the 20 July plot conspirators in our timeline) after being found guilty of war crimes. In the former US government's place is a puppet government akin to what happened in our timeline to the Czech part of Czechoslovakia during the German occupation.

Thirty years later in 1976, Hideki Tojo and Adolf Hitler are preparing to board trains that will carry them to their historic meeting marking the 30th anniversary of their victory over the United States. The celebration is to be held at The Divide, a small town that is exactly equidistant between the Atlantic Ocean and the Pacific Ocean, at the somewhat uneasy boundary between the two empires.

The division is both geographical and cultural. Germany has integrated the eastern part of defeated America into the Greater German Reich while the western part is occupied by Japan, as part of the Greater Co-prosperity Sphere and more a colony than anything else. In both cases, the subjugation is almost complete.

The story commences with the assassination of the Japanese general who conquered the area by using methods like those of Tomoyuki Yamashita in Malaya and Masaharu Homma in the Philippines. The story then moves back and forth between the two areas of occupation, but the emphasis is heavily on the German side.

The plot centers on the efforts of an anti-partisan officer of the SS who tries to find the perpetrators of the assassination and to determine if it is a harbinger of actions at the Tojo-Hitler meeting.

As the action moves forward, information appears on the details of the new German-American synthesis. It is a land of Europeans; the result of a "Final Solution," which encompassed most other minorities, including Native Americans and blacks. What occurred in the Japanese sector is never completely addressed but it is hinted that the ethnic cleansing took place, though in a less industrialized manner, like the Rape of Nanjing instead of death camps. After 30 years, the American people more or less accept or perhaps put up with the occupation.

The resistance movement has elements scattered around the country in both occupied zones and have some inter-group communication. However, the groups are rarely not engaged in partisan activity. That is especially the case for the official component, a stay-behind military and scientific group that was charged by President Wheeler, just before the surrender in 1946, with a secret project that could, if successful, reverse the country's fortunes. Its task to develop a new weapon became, as the war ended and the new regimes take over, so important the group feared that any action would cause them to be discovered. Thus, doing nothing and remaining in what was more or less a prison, albeit a comfortable one, evolved into its mission long after the weapon was perfected. It falls, therefore, to newcomers, those who had carried out no act of rebellion in years, perhaps decades, to agitate its use. They, along with the surviving scientist, set out to ambush the trains.

The outsiders and misanthropes even by the standards of the "survival-at-any-cost" members of the stay-behind head out with their device to try to change the course of history.

The narrative occasionally contains third-person comments, which create a sense of the story being told after the fact. That is at odds with the rest of the narrative and is almost as if the author is acting as a Greek chorus of sorts and is puzzling, as it implies associated events outside the storyline but related to it.

The puzzlement dissipates as the book comes to an end. The malcontents and disaffected and the disenfranchised and threatened unite in an act of rebellion that needed little more than a "hero" to act as the catalyst. What will happen remains unclear, but it is possible that the events are ongoing.

== See also ==
- The Man in the High Castle
- Hypothetical Axis victory in World War II
