= Clash of Eagles =

1990 novel by Leo Rutman

- First edition
- Author: Leo Rutman
- Language: English
- Genre: Alternate history
- Publisher: Fawcett Publications
- Publication date: July 29, 1990
- Publication place: United States
- Media type: Print (Paperback)
- ISBN: 0-449-14596-4
- OCLC: 22334199

Clash of Eagles is a 1990 alternate history novel by Leo Rutman.

== Plot summary ==
December, 1941. Nazi Germany has vanquished the United Kingdom and launches a major invasion across the Atlantic. German forces under Erwin Rommel land in Quebec and sweep down on Canada, New England, and the Ohio Valley to New York City and declare the eastern United States an occupied territory. The rest of the United States remains unoccupied but perilously exposed to further attacks. President Franklin D. Roosevelt and the government administration evacuate the endangered Washington, D.C., and flee westward to California. Life in the major cities has become a grim nightmare as the new Nazi regime takes over. Slowly, however, a resistance movement has begun to grow. Determined to rout the invaders, the populous rise up. They fight to the death, some at the cost of their lives, to take their country back.

== References in other works ==
Gavriel David Rosenfeld, a lecturer in (actual) history at the University of California, Los Angeles, cited Clash of Eagles in his novel The World Hitler Never Made.

== See also ==
- Hypothetical Axis victory in World War II – includes an extensive list of other Wikipedia articles regarding works of Nazi Germany/Axis/World War II alternate history
