= The Afrika Reich =

2011 novel by Guy Saville

- First edition
- Author: Guy Saville
- Language: English
- Genre: Thriller, alternative history novel
- Publisher: Hodder & Staughton
- Publication date: 17 February 2011
- Publication place: United Kingdom
- Media type: Print (Hardback)
- Pages: 448 pp (first edition, hardback)
- ISBN: 978-0-80-509593-7 (first edition, hardback)
- Followed by: The Madagaskar Plan

The Afrika Reich is a 2011 alternate history action thriller novel by Guy Saville in which the point of divergence is the United Kingdom being defeated by Nazi Germany during the Dunkirk Campaign in 1940, which forces Britain to sign a non-aggression pact with Germany. The influence of an active Colonial Policy Office (KPA) makes the Nazis carve up a new colonial empire in Africa and extend their racial genocide to black Africans. By 1952, the United Kingdom and Germany have divided up much of the continent between themselves.

The Afrika Reich was inspired by a passage in The Man in the High Castle. Saville used experience as a newspaper correspondent in the Amazon jungle to create scenes set in the African jungle.

A sequel, The Madagaskar Plan, was published in 2015 and begins shortly after the first book's events.

== Plot ==
The story is based around the British mercenary Burton Cole, who has been dispatched on a secret mission by the British government to assassinate Walter Hochburg, the German governor-general of the Kongo. The plot occurs against the backdrop of increasing tensions between Britain and Germany that threaten to disrupt the uneasy truce, made in 1940 following a more disastrous defeat for Britain at the Battle of Dunkirk.

In September 1952, Burton, posing as an SS surveyor, enters Schadelplatz, which is named for its plaza of skulls; Hochburg says it's made of "twenty thousand nigger skulls". It can accommodate panzers and gains access to Hochburg's office. Burton has taken the mission at the behest of Ackerman, a representative of the Lusaka Mining Corporation, because of his vendetta with Hochburg.

Assassinating Hochburg and escaping with the aid of Patrick, an American from the defunct French Foreign Legion, Cole is able to escape the Schadelplatz and to meet with his team in a Central African Airlines plane from Rhodesia. However, they are soon spotted and shot down by Waffen-SS troops. Burton and Patrick then flee for German Aquatoriana to reach British Nigeria.

In a subplot, Neliah, a Herero living in Portuguese Northern Angola (Southern Angola of the Benguela Railway was "appropriated" by the Reich in 1949) with her sister, Zuri, as well as members of the Resistencia, a Portuguese anti-Nazi insurgent group, are sent on a trek to Luanda in the face of a German invasion and, more personally, the potential for deportation to Deutsch Westafrika. Colloquially known as "Muspel", all African blacks in German territories have been deported there as part of the Nazi racial purification policy.

Forced to flee from the Kongo after a failed attempt to steal a Luftwaffe plane from an airbase that is fighting a Belgian-French insurgency, Burton and Patrick head for their agent in Stanleystadt, the capital of German Afrika (apparently the site of Stanleyville), who is a Frenchman named Rougier. They are forced to flee across the roof of his apartment, and he falls into traffic before he can inform Cole of Ackerman's identity.

Captured by a German conscription gang while attempting to escape to Neu Berlin, Burton and Patrick are taken south along the Pan-African Autobahn (PAA, or Road of Friendship) to the North Angolan border, where they are separated. Forced to clear a tunnel that Neliah's insurgents have destroyed, Burton soon meets Neliah, and they flee with Zuri westwards.

Patrick meanwhile is imprisoned by SS officer Uhrig in a facility in which he discovers the dark secret of the German section of the PAA: the corpses of dead German soldiers mixed with gypsum and limestone are ground into the road, as part of Hochburg's ideal of "Aryanising" Africa. Escaping, Patrick meets with Zuri but is recaptured, with Burton and Neliah rescuing them moments before Zuri is gang-raped.

Hijacking an abandoned train, they move along the Salazar Railway to Luanda but are caught up by German Walkure helicopters. Although they take down three of them and a troop transport, they are derailed. However, they still manage to reach Luanda, which holds out, thanks to an agreement between Afrika Korps commander Field Marshal von Arnim and the Portuguese governors. Heading for the British consulate, Burton makes some discoveries: "Ackerman" is really from British Intelligence, and "Rougier" is a member of the Gestapo who testified at the trial of Dolan, a Welshman who was part of the assassination team. Hochburg was not assassinated by Burton, but it was a decoy. Von Arnim and the British are collaborating in a phony war in North Angola and Rhodesia to reduce the influence of the SS, which Arnim claims to have swayed Hitler's mind from reality. For example, the deportation of the blacks to Muspel reduced many plantation-owners to ruins, despite their progress.

Hochburg orders the German Army forward and the British consulate destroyed. Entering Luanda's sewers, Burton, Patrick and Neliah make for the docks to get on a tug, which will take them to a waiting Royal Navy ship. Neliah, defiant to the end, remains to fend off Uhrig, who has pursued them and presumably dies in the final defense of Luanda.

Although Burton and Patrick escape on a tug, they are ambushed by SS torpedo boat attackers led by Hochburg. Burton and Patrick fight them off, and in the end, only Cole and Hochburg are left alive. The reasons for their vendetta is revealed. Burton, the son of a German settler in Togoland and a British woman, lived in an orphanage in the jungle after the Great War. Hochburg came to them as a missionary and had seen his family brutally killed by tribesmen, the root of his racist hatred.

Although Hochburg was taken in, he engaged in an affair with Cole's mother and eloped with her. However, she left to go back for Burton and was murdered by tribesmen. That led Burton's father into a depression, and when Hochburg returned to burn down the orphanage, he remained while Burton fled to join the French Foreign Legion. There he met Patrick, whom he saved during the Dunkirk evacuation; this led to his mercenary life. As their tug begins to sink, Cole gets into a rowboat and leaves Hochburg to his fate. Hochburg gives a Parthian shot as his last words and says it was because of Burton that his mother died.

Looking back at the spot on which his best friend and worst enemy died and at the ruins of Luanda, Burton contemplates his return to Madeleine, his lover in Suffolk. He comes to realise after a conversation with Ackerman that her husband, Jared, had authorized the mission, which had been intended to fail from the start. With that in mind, Burton wants the ship to go faster, as the book ends with a historical note on the story's background.

== Reception ==
The novel was reviewed favourably by The Times and The Economist. A review in Publishers Weekly described it as "tremendously satisfying", stating "Saville gets everything right—providing suspenseful action sequences, logical but enthralling plot twists, a fully thought through imaginary world, and characters with depth." It was also reviewed in Booklist.

A review in Christian Science Monitor praised Saville's "meticulous research" however stated the book "never quite rises above the level of an airport bookstore bestseller – a fun read, but not truly outstanding. It rests too much on fast-paced action sequences to pull the reader through the plot."

Academic Gavriel Rosenfeld states that The Afrika Reich is part of a trend which "de-center[s] the Final Solution of the Jewish Question from the Third Reich's larger genocidal crimes".

== Guy Saville ==
Guy Saville (born 1973) is a British author best known for The Afrika Reich and its sequel The Madagaskar Plan (2015). The Afrika novels imagine a universe in which the Nazis won World War II and the swastika flies over much of the world.

Saville's work has been described as "dystopian," and he believes that a rise in interest in dystopian fiction dovetailed with the first presidency of Donald Trump in the United States.

Saville resides in Colchester.

== See also ==
- Hypothetical Axis victory in World War II
