= Neal Purvis and Robert Wade =

British screenwriting duo (born 1961)

Neal Purvis
- Born: September 1961 (age 65)
- Occupation: Screenwriter

Robert Wade
- Born: Robert Newton Wade; September 1961 (age 65)
- Occupation: Screenwriter

Neal Purvis (born September 1961) and Robert Wade (born September 1961) are British screenwriters. They are best known for writing seven James Bond films, from 1999's The World Is Not Enough to 2021's No Time to Die.

== Early lives ==
Purvis's father was a photographer, and as a teenager, Purvis was in a film club that focused on 1940s cinema.

Wade was born in Penarth and lived there until he was 11. His mother was an artist, and from an early age, he wanted to be a writer and began making homemade films as a teenager.

They met each other while attending the University of Kent, when they were assigned as roommates. They began playing in a band together, which they continued to do for at least 20 years. Purvis left Kent and completed a BA in Film and Photo Arts. Wade graduated from Kent and moved to London, where he was later joined by Purvis. They spent six years writing scripts together, as well as ghostwriting treatments for music videos.

== Films ==
Wade and Purvis' screenplay for Let Him Have It (1991) (based on the true story of Derek Bentley, a young man who gets caught up in street gangs in post war London and is later controversially hanged), displayed the writers' "outrage toward a system hell-bent on vengeance" and was called "first rate, no non-sense".

Barbara Broccoli, producer of the James Bond films, hired Wade and Purvis to write their first Bond script because she had seen their film Plunkett & Macleane (1999) and liked that it was "dark, witty, sexy and inventive". Purvis described their approach when they joined the Bond franchise as to "come in with ideas, things we've found in science magazines, on the internet, interesting weapons and what's happening in technology. Then we find a journey for Bond to go through." In their Bond collaborations, Wade generally does "all the verbiage at the beginning of the script." They created a novelisation of their Bond script for The World Is Not Enough in collaboration with Raymond Benson. Wade and Purvis also wrote a script for a Bond spin-off featuring the Die Another Day character Jinx (Halle Berry), which was attached to director Stephen Frears, but cancelled by MGM because of budget concerns and "creative differences".

Their 2003 Bond parody, Johnny English starring comedian Rowan Atkinson, received generally mixed reviews from critics, receiving a 33% "rotten" rating at the review site Rotten Tomatoes. However, the film earned $160.5 million in its global box office receipts. A sequel, Johnny English Reborn, based upon their characters but written by Hamish McColl, was released in 2011.

Purvis and Wade wrote and produced Return to Sender (also known as Convicted), which was described as a "gripping tale" of a man "fighting to prevent a miscarriage of justice". They had originally written the script while doing research for their first film 14 years earlier.

In 2005, they co-authored the bio-pic Stoned (also known as The Wild and Wycked World of Brian Jones) about the last days of the life of The Rolling Stones co-founder, Brian Jones, which they based on an account from a builder on the farm where Jones died, claiming that Jones's death was not accidental as recorded by the coroner. The film was criticised for "fail[ing] to convey what mattered about Jones artistically, what he contributed to music, why we should feel more than pity."

When Daniel Craig was signed on as the new Bond, Wade described their approach to screenwriting thus: "When you have an actor you play to his strengths ... He's got this great toughness to him but not an unthinking toughness. I think that's where the films will need to go." Their first work for Craig as Bond, Casino Royale, was nominated for a BAFTA Award for Best Adapted Screenplay, and received a 4/4 review from Roger Ebert, who stated that the film "has the answers to all my complaints about the forty-five-year-old James Bond series, and some I hadn't even thought of." However, their follow up Quantum of Solace, which was not based on any Ian Fleming work, was criticised because while having "the right ingredients: plenty of car, plane or boat chases ... spooks, vendettas, and turncoats", it lacked the "magic, and a decent plot."

Their screenplay for Skyfall, which they co-wrote with John Logan, was described by Frank DiGiacomo of Movieline as being "very wily" for having Bond experience a mid-life crisis. In 2012, it was announced that "after a tremendous run" with the Bond franchise, Wade and Purvis would not be involved in the 24th Bond film, which would be solo written by Logan. However, on 27 June 2014, it was announced that they were being brought on to polish the screenplay for the next film. In November 2014, it was announced that the BBC has commissioned Wade and Purvis to adapt Len Deighton's 1978 novel SS-GB. It was broadcast on BBC One in five one-hour episodes from 19 February 2017 and 19 March 2017.

On 10 March 2017, it was reported that they were approached to write the script for No Time to Die. In July 2017, it was initially reported they would write the script, but in May 2018, EON announced that director Danny Boyle was instead working with his regular collaborator John Hodge on a new script. In September 2018, following Boyle's departure from the project, Purvis and Wade were re-hired to write a new script.

== Family life ==
Wade and his wife live in West Sussex and have four children.

== Filmography ==
=== Film ===
Year	Title	Director	Notes
1991	Let Him Have It	Peter Medak	
1997	An American Werewolf in Paris	Anthony Waller	Uncredited rewrite
1999	Plunkett & Macleane	Jake Scott	
1999	The World Is Not Enough	Michael Apted	
2002	Die Another Day	Lee Tamahori	
2003	Johnny English	Peter Howitt	
2004	Return to Sender	Bille August	
2005	Stoned	Stephen Woolley	Also co-producers
2006	Casino Royale	Martin Campbell	Also co-producers
2008	Quantum of Solace	Marc Forster	
2011	Johnny English Reborn	Oliver Parker	Characters created by only
2012	Skyfall	Sam Mendes	
2015	Spectre	Sam Mendes	
2021	No Time to Die	Cary Joji Fukunaga	

=== Television ===
Year	Title	Writers	Executive producers	Notes
2017	SS-GB	Yes	Yes	

Refs:
