= The Madagaskar Plan =

2015 novel by Guy Saville

- First edition
- Author: Guy Saville
- Language: English
- Genre: Adventure, alternative history novel
- Publisher: Hodder & Staughton
- Publication date: 16 July 2015
- Publication place: United Kingdom
- Media type: Print (Hardback)
- Pages: 518 pp (first edition, hardback)
- ISBN: 978-1-444-71068-7 (first edition, hardback)
- Preceded by: The Afrika Reich

The Madagaskar Plan is a 2015 alternate history adventure novel by Guy Saville, and the sequel to his book The Afrika Reich.

In the book, the United Kingdom and Nazi Germany have negotiated a peace treaty after the destruction of the British Expeditionary Force (BEF) in the Battle of Dunkirk. This peace treaty allowed Germany to conquer much of Africa, which averts the Holocaust. Instead, the Nazis have implemented their Madagascar Plan, a scheme to deport European Jews to Madagascar. In the novel, five million Jews have been sent to the island.

== Plot ==
Following on directly from events in Saville's previous novel The Afrika Reich, the protagonist, Burton Cole, returns home to Britain to find that his lover, Madeleine, has vanished. Meanwhile, Hochburg’s invasion of Rhodesia has turned to disaster and his forces have been driven back by the Rhodesian Army across the border to the Kongo. Emboldened by his failure, anti-Nazi guerrillas in the north of the Kongo—secretly aided by the British and Portuguese—have launched a new insurgency, which leaves Hochburg to fight a war on two fronts. After a conference call with Himmler, Hochburg realises that there will be no reinforcements from Europe. Visiting the Shinkolobwe mine, he learns of a super-weapon that will help him turn the tide of the war. Because of Hitler’s policy banning the development of nuclear weapons, the only people capable of developing a bomb for Hochburg are Jewish physicists exiled to Madagascar. Hochburg travels to the island and comes into conflict with its governor, Odilo Globočnik.

Cole has discovered that Madeleine has been sent to the island as a prisoner and smuggles himself there in an effort to find her. He visits the scuppered cruiseliner, the Wilhelm Gustloff, which is moored off the island and holds the records of all the Jews on Madagascar and learns of Madeleine’s address in the town of Antsohihy.

In a third strand, Salois, a leader of the Jewish resistance is given a mission to destroy the German naval base of Diego Suarez. On the northern end of Madagascar, the base allows the Kriegsmarine to dominate the Indian Ocean, now renamed to Ostafrikanischer Ozean. Unless the base is taken out of action, the British will never be able to defeat the Germans in Africa.

As Burton tracks down Madeleine across the island, and Hochburg and Globočnik clash over the physicists, the strands of the novel come together at Mandritsara, the location of a secret Nazi medical facility. Salois is killed, and Globočnik unleashes a flood against the Jews. Hochburg escapes the island with his nuclear secrets, which leaves Burton to vow his revenge.

== Historical characters ==
Along with the Nazi leadership, a number of real figures appear as characters in the book:

- Lord Halifax, the prime minister of the United Kingdom who signs a peace treaty with Hitler that effectively ends the war.
- Odilo Globocnik, the governor of Madagaskar.
- Admiral Dommes, the commanding officer of the Diego-Suarez base.
- Robert Taft, the recently elected president of the United States.

== Reception ==
A review in Publishers Weekly wrote that "Saville's attention to detail is manifest throughout". A review in Kirkus Reviews wrote that "the realpolitik seems credible".

== See also ==
- Axis victory in World War II

== Sources ==
- Picker, Lenny (8 June 2015). "Ripple in Time: PW Talks with Guy Saville". Publishers Weekly. 262 (23): 38.
- Pitt, David (15 May 2015). "The Madagaskar Plan". Booklist. 111 (18): 38.
- "The Madagaskar Plan". Kirkus Reviews. 83 (1): 245. June 2015.
