= Emperor (Baxter novel) =

2006 novel by Stephen Baxter

- First edition
- Author: Stephen Baxter
- Language: English
- Series: Time's Tapestry
- Genre: Alternate history, science fiction
- Publisher: Gollancz
- Publication date: July 2006
- Publication place: United Kingdom
- Media type: Print (Hardcover Paperback)
- Pages: 302
- ISBN: 0-575-07432-9
- Followed by: Conqueror

Emperor is a science fiction novel by British writer Stephen Baxter, the first in his alternate history series Time's Tapestry. It was first published in 2006 by Gollancz, and later published in the United States by Ace Books in 2007.

== Synopsis ==
A mysterious prophecy from the future shapes the destiny of a family through four centuries of the Roman occupation of Britain. The story begins in 4 BC and incorporates such later events as the building of Hadrian's Wall and an attempted assassination of Constantine I. It ends in AD 418.

== See also ==
- Conqueror
- Navigator
- Weaver
