= Return to Sender (2004 film) =

- Theatrical release poster
- Directed by: Bille August
- Written by: Neal Purvis; Robert Wade
- Produced by: Michael Lunderskov
- Starring: Connie Nielsen; Aidan Quinn; Kelly Preston
- Cinematography: Dirk Bruel
- Edited by: John Scott
- Music by: Harry Gregson-Williams
- Production company: Moviefan Scandinavia A/S
- Distributed by: Intandem Films; Audley Films
- Release date: 2004
- Running time: 109 minutes
- Countries: Denmark; United Kingdom

Return to Sender is a 2004 film written by Neal Purvis and Robert Wade and directed by Bille August. It was also released on video under the title Convicted. The film stars Aidan Quinn, Connie Nielsen and Kelly Preston.

Aidan Quinn was nominated for a 2005 IFTA Best Actor in a Feature Film award for his performance. Quinn plays an unscrupulous attorney who is challenged by Nielsen, his latest client.

== Plot ==
Quinn's character, a jaded ex-lawyer, has been befriending and exploiting death row convicts and selling their final letters to the media. While attempting to foster his relationship with Nielsen's character, he becomes convinced that she is innocent.

== Cast ==
- Connie Nielsen as Charlotte Cory
- Aidan Quinn as Frank Nitzche
- Tim Daly as Martin North
- Kelly Preston as Susan Kennan
- Mark Ryan as Mark Schlesser
- Mark Holton as Joe Charbonic
- Sara-Marie Maltha as Stella / Julie
- Bill Thomas as Gubby
- Randy Colton as Joe Hammond

== Reception ==
Todd McCarthy of Variety gave the film a negative review and suggested it "should be returned to maker" and says the film shows "absolutely no feel for its characters or setting, pic doesn't convince on any level".
