= SS-GB (TV series) =

2017 British drama series

- Genre: Alternative history; Thriller
- Created by: Len Deighton
- Based on: SS-GB by Len Deighton
- Written by: Neal Purvis and Robert Wade
- Directed by: Philipp Kadelbach
- Starring: Sam Riley; Kate Bosworth; James Cosmo
- Composer: Dan Jones
- Country of origin: United Kingdom
- Original language: English
- No. of series: 1
- No. of episodes: 5

Production
- Executive producers: Sally Woodward Gentle; Lee Morris; Neal Purvis; Robert Wade
- Producer: Patrick Schweitzer
- Production location: London
- Cinematography: Stuart Bentley
- Editor: David Blackmoore
- Running time: 60 minutes
- Production company: Sid Gentle Films Ltd

Original release
- Network: BBC One
- Release: 19 February – 19 March 2017

SS-GB is a 2017 British five-part drama produced for the BBC and based on the 1978 novel of the same name by Len Deighton. It is set in a 1941 alternative timeline in which the United Kingdom is occupied by Nazi Germany during the Second World War.

== Background ==
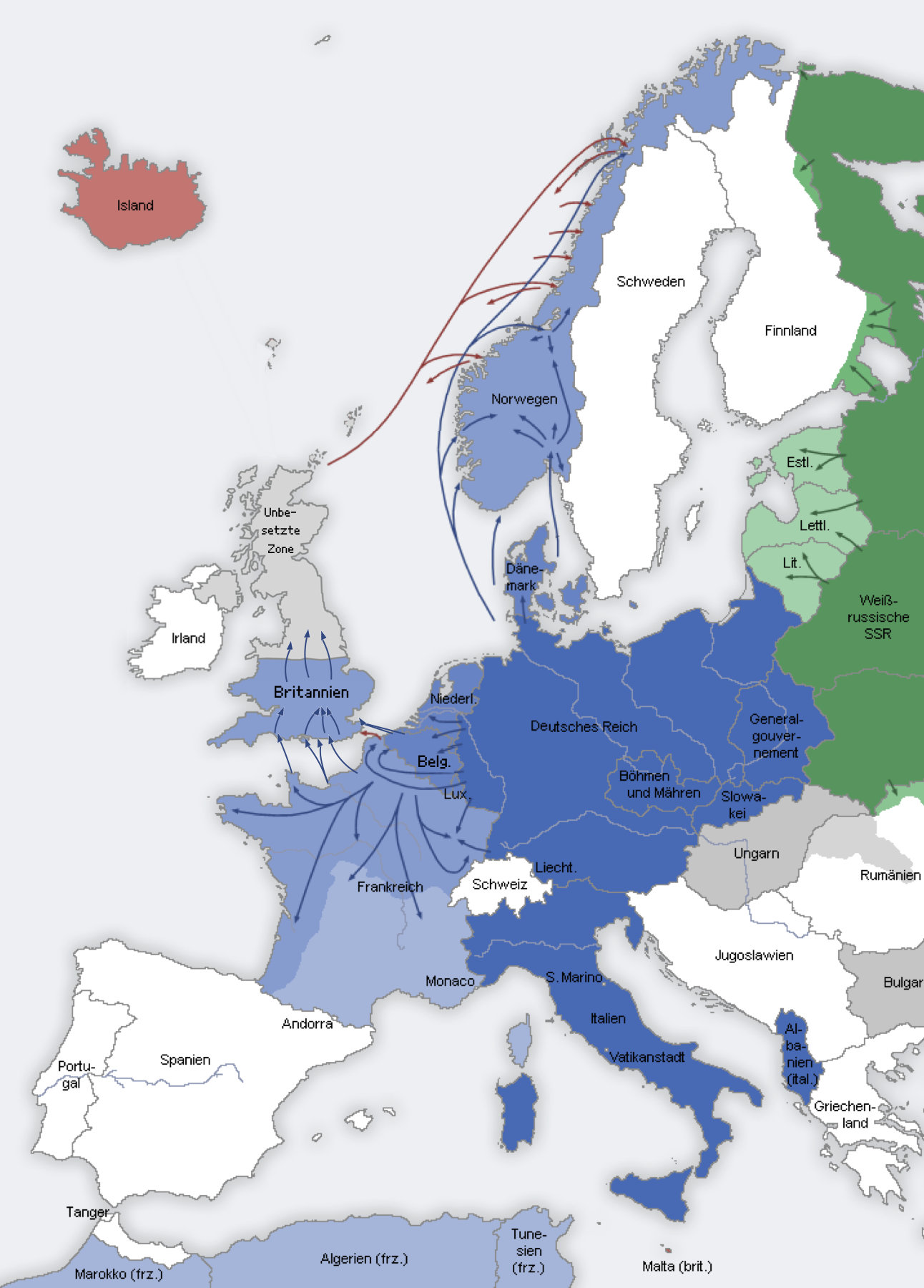
Europe in 1941, as depicted in the series, nine months after the Royal Air Force lost the Battle of Britain to the German Luftwaffe. The southern part of Great Britain is controlled by Nazi Germany, while the northern part is an unoccupied zone, although conflicts still occur in the area.

In the alternative world, it is November 1941, nine months after a successful German invasion of Britain. Winston Churchill has been executed, and King George VI is a prisoner who has not been seen in public for some time. His queen, Elizabeth, and their daughters Elizabeth and Margaret have escaped. A British government in exile, led by Rear-Admiral Conolly, exists but is not recognised by the United States. Nazi Germany has also maintained friendly relations with the Soviet Union, and Soviet Foreign Minister Molotov has just flown in to oversee the removal of the body of Karl Marx to the Soviet Union.

Douglas Archer, a Scotland Yard murder squad Detective Superintendent with a stellar reputation, is working under a German superior from the Schutzstaffel's (SS) Security Service, the security force of the Nazi Party. Though his wife was killed by a German bombing raid in the Blitz, Archer avoids involvement in political crimes and views resistance to the Nazis as futile. A routine murder investigation becomes political when it appears to have been perpetrated by agents of the British Resistance. An aggressive SS officer arrives and takes control of the investigation, which is of interest to the SS because the victim may have possessed data from the German Army's programme to produce an atomic bomb. Archer also learns that his secretary and lover, Sylvia Manning, is a member of the British Resistance, and he is reluctantly drawn into a conspiracy against the Germans.

== Production ==
In November 2014, it was announced that the BBC had commissioned writers Neal Purvis and Robert Wade to adapt Len Deighton's novel SS-GB.

In August 2015, it was announced that Sam Riley was in talks to star in the lead role of Detective Superintendent Douglas Archer of Scotland Yard. Riley's casting was confirmed in late September 2015.

Production began in October 2015 and ended in January 2016. The series was produced by Sid Gentle Films Ltd. It was broadcast on BBC One in five one-hour episodes from 19 February 2017 and 19 March 2017.

The series filmed various scenes for episodes 1 to 4 at the Chatham Historic Dockyard in Kent. The location was used as a double for London streets and the mortuary that is featured in episode 1.

== Cast ==
- Sam Riley as Detective Superintendent Douglas Archer, a Scotland Yard detective in German-occupied London
- Kate Bosworth as Barbara Barga, an American reporter
- Rainer Bock as Gruppenführer Fritz Kellermann, the SS/Gestapo officer supervising the police force
- Aneurin Barnard as Police Constable Jimmy Dunn, a junior policeman working with Archer
- Christina Cole as Joyce Sheenan, Archer's neighbour who cares for his son and whose own husband is a prisoner-of-war
- Maeve Dermody as Sylvia Manning, Archer's secretary and lover
- Lars Eidinger as Standartenführer Oskar Huth, an SS officer newly arrived in London
- James Cosmo as Detective Sergeant Harry Woods, Archer's friend and co-worker
- Jason Flemyng as Colonel George Mayhew, a British aristocrat, former army officer and a leader of the British Resistance
- James Northcote as Dr John Spode, an atomic physicist working with the British Resistance
- Ronald Zehrfeld as Captain Hans Hesse
- Sam Kronis as Heinrich Himmler
- Kit Connor as Bob Sheenan

== Episodes ==
| No. overall | No. in series | Title | Directed by | Written by | Original release date | UK viewers (millions) |
|---|---|---|---|---|---|---|
| 1 | 1 | "Episode 1" | Philipp Kadelbach | Neal Purvis and Robert Wade | 19 February 2017 | 8.68 |
Detective Superintendent Douglas Archer is looking into a routine murder in German-occupied London when SS officer Oskar Huth arrives and assumes control of the investigation. Archer learns that his secretary and lover, Sylvia Manning, is involved with the British Resistance against the Nazis.
| 2 | 2 | "Episode 2" | Philipp Kadelbach | Neal Purvis and Robert Wade | 26 February 2017 | 5.54 |
Archer and Huth foil a plot by the Resistance to abduct Archer's son for leverage. Archer later lets Sylvia escape again. He is approached by a cabal of British gentlemen who appear to be conspiring against the Germans, and he goes home with American reporter Barbara Barga. She warns Archer that if he refuses to co-operate with the Resistance, it may kill him. Archer deduces that his murder victim, William Spode, was an atomic physicist working for a German faction outside the SS and was presumably killed by the Resistance. Police Constable Jimmy Dunn is murdered by Resistance vigilantes, who believe that he collaborated with the Nazis.
| 3 | 3 | "Episode 3" | Philipp Kadelbach | Neal Purvis and Robert Wade | 5 March 2017 | 4.30 |
A Resistance operative tries to kill Archer, who later interrogates Spode's brother, John, who is killed by cyanide cigarette. George Mayhew and General von Ruff are plotting to rescue King George from Nazi captivity as a means for the German Army to discredit the SS. Archer finds a film canister left behind by William and has its contents developed in secret. The Resistance detonates a bomb at a German-Soviet ceremony to remove Karl Marx's body to the Soviet Union.
| 4 | 4 | "Episode 4" | Philipp Kadelbach | Neal Purvis and Robert Wade | 12 March 2017 | 3.79 |
Archer sends his son out of the city to the unoccupied zone. Harry Woods and Sylvia are picked up as the Nazis impose martial law on London. Archer agrees to help Mayhew free the king and entrusts Barbara with Spode's negatives, which contain images of atomic calculations. Archer's superior Fritz Kellermann arranges for Harry's release, and Archer shelters Sylvia at his flat. One of Mayhew's conspirators is murdered, but the rescue plan proceeds. Barbara is taken by the SS.
| 5 | 5 | "Episode 5" | Philipp Kadelbach | Neal Purvis and Robert Wade | 19 March 2017 | 3.54 |
Archer and Harry transport King George, who is gravely ill, but they have engine trouble and call Sylvia for aid. The US embassy secures Barbara's release before Kellermann can interrogate her with torture. Archer, Harry and Sylvia flee with the King as Kellermann learns of the escape and sends men in pursuit. They are ambushed by Huth at the rendezvous point, and Sylvia and the King are killed. Working with the Resistance, an American battleship attacks and destroys the German atomic research centre at Bringle Sands, the King's escape being a diversion to lure the security forces. Having placed all blame on Huth, Kellermann executes him by firing squad. Archer escapes with the negatives into the countryside, with Kellermann uncertain whether he's dead or alive.

== Media ==
=== DVD ===
- Label: BBC Worldwide
- Release Date: 10 July 2018
- Catalogue Nº: BBCDVD 4131
- Availability: Unknown at time of writing

Two-disc Region 2 DVD set containing all five episodes, complete with all "Previously..." and "Next time..." teaser sequences.

==== Special features ====
- Archer of the Yard
- Creating the Aesthetic
- SS-GB Behind the Scenes

=== Novel (TV tie-in edition) ===
A new edition of Len Deighton's novel, with a cover photograph of Sam Riley as Douglas Archer, was made available to tie-in with the original 2017 transmission. ISBN 978-0-00-816615-1

== Reception ==
SS-GB received highly-positive reviews, with The Telegraph giving the series 4 out of 5 and saying that the "alt-history thriller deserves a follow-up series". The main criticisms were against the sound quality and the reportedly-inaudible dialogue for some viewers in the first episode, which the BBC offered to "look at" for future episodes.

The first episode achieved good ratings, with over 8.5 million viewers tuning in. However, as the series went on, ratings gradually fell, with only 3.5 million watching the final episode.

The review by The Guardian awarded three of five stars based on a viewing of the first two episodes. It commented that the series "holds up handsomely on the big screen, favouring film noir style over pulp content" but added that "it would be helpful to see more of the minutiae of London life under the Nazis, to get some fresh air after being confined to the corridors of power".

The series was released on DVD and BD on 10 July 2018; approximately a year later, the Rotten Tomatoes site showed a Critic's Consensus of 89% favourable and commented, "SS-GB is a convincingly wrought slice of hypothetical history, drenched in noir style and dense with moral quandaries".

== See also ==
- The Man in the High Castle
- Fatherland
- Philadelphia Experiment II
- An Englishman's Castle
- It Happened Here
- Hypothetical Axis victory in World War II
