= Navigator (novel) =

2007 novel by Stephen Baxter

- First edition
- Author: Stephen Baxter
- Language: English
- Series: Time's Tapestry
- Genre: Alternate history, science fiction
- Publisher: Gollancz
- Publication date: July 2007
- Publication place: United Kingdom
- Media type: Print (Hardcover Paperback)
- Pages: 321
- ISBN: 0-575-07675-5
- OCLC: 85897892
- Preceded by: Conqueror
- Followed by: Weaver

Navigator is a science fiction novel by British writer Stephen Baxter, the third in his alternate history series Time's Tapestry.

== Synopsis ==
The novel, which begins in AD 1070, ends in AD 1492 as Christopher Columbus sails westward.

== Publication history ==
Navigator was published by Ace Books in 2007.

== Reception ==
The book was received positively by critics. Publishers Weekly described Baxter's writing of historical characters as strong. A review in Vector noted that the book changed the formula from the previous two books in the series, however, the author stated that the exclusion of previous characters was jarring.

== See also ==
- Emperor
- Conqueror
- Weaver
