= Captain Axis =

Comic book character

Captain Axis is a fictional character appearing in American comic books published by Marvel Comics. The character first appeared in The Incredible Hulk #155 (September 1972).

== Fictional character biography ==
Captain Axis was once a Nazi scientist who became a fugitive after World War II, and later worked for Doctor Doom until he became trapped in the Microverse, where he eventually fought the Hulk.
