= Collaborator (novel) =

Book by Murray Davies

- Cover of UK edition.
- Author: Murray Davies
- Language: English
- Subject: Ordinary Britons cope with conquest and forced collaboration by Nazi Germany.
- Genre: Alternate history
- Publisher: Macmillan
- Publication date: (pb) September, 2004
- Publication place: United Kingdom and the United States
- English publication date: (hc) September, 2003 (pb) September, 2004
- Media type: hardback and paperback

Collaborator is an alternate history novel by Murray Davies, published as a hardcover on 19 September 2003 and released in paperback in the United Kingdom and the United States in September 2004. The novel is set in a Nazi-occupied Great Britain in 1940 and 1941. It chronicles life during this period primarily through the experiences of Nick Penny, the collaborator of the novel's title.

== Background ==
The novel is premised on the successful German invasion of Britain in September 1940. The reason for this success is never clearly explained, but a major factor appears to have been the transfer of the French navy to the Germans after the fall of France. Battles were fought on British soil in London and Ashford, and the Irish Free State is also occupied. In the end, King George VI and the rest of the British royal family and government flee to Canada, where Winston Churchill leads a government in exile. In London, Samuel Hoare leads a collaborating government, while the Duke of Windsor returns to become regent. The Germans are attempting to charm the British people into submission. Organisations sprout up promoting Anglo-German friendship. However, there is a darker side to the occupation as one hundred people have been killed in Liverpool and Glasgow. Jewish people are beginning to be persecuted, whilst a resistance movement is steadily growing.

== Plot summary ==
The novel begins in December 1940 with the return of Sergeant Nick Penny to his home in an unnamed West Country port town. A former prisoner of war, he had been captured in the aftermath of the successful German invasion of Britain. A former schoolteacher, his ability to speak German had secured his release to work as a translator for the military governor of region, Generalleutnant Kurt von Glass. Glass soon puts Penny to work in organising the "Anglo-German Friendship League", which is designed to foster greater unity. Penny is uncomfortable with his current position, and is viewed with suspicion by much of the community. Soon after his return, he visits the Three Horseshoes, a local pub operated by the family of his friend, Roy Locke. There he reconnects with Locke, who immediately begins to recruit him for the emerging resistance movement. Penny begs off, requesting time while he sorts matters out.

Penny soon finds himself drawn into the resistance, motivated in part by the gradually increasing harshness of German rule. Penny's mother and sister, with whom he lives, suffer physically and psychologically from the effects of German rule, while Penny's nephew, David, desires to strike back. Though Glass supports Penny's suggestions for fostering Anglo-German amity, the region's security chief, Standartenführer Stolz, is using every pretext for brutalising the local population. Penny and Locke nearly miss curfew, but are saved at the last minute by the timely arrival of Matty Cordington, their old friend, who was released from internment and who brought Sara Burskin, a Polish refugee, with him. Roy quickly enlists them into a plan to smuggle the Regent, his wife, and the crown jewels out of the country, but they are thwarted by the Abwehr. Though Penny and Cordington manage to evade capture, Locke is arrested but kills himself before revealing any information.

After their failed operation, Penny loses contact with the resistance. Loathing his life, he watches as profiteers like the local newsagent reap the benefits of the growing crackdown on Jewish businesses. In March, however, the German invasion of the Soviet Union breathes new life into the resistance as Communists now join the effort. Penny is contacted once again by Coral Kennedy, a young woman whom he met during the failed effort to smuggle out the Regent and the jewels. Once again involved with the resistance, Penny assists in a number of their operations, informing Kennedy of an attempt by the IRA to assassinate Glass and helping to smuggle a Danish scientist and his wife out of the country. Yet these are isolated successes amidst a series of setbacks, as the Germans disrupt operations and shut down networks. Glass himself soon leaves Britain to serve on the Eastern Front; his departure coincides with the roundup of foreign-born Jews by the authorities, including one in hiding on Cordington's estate. A ruse by the resistance reveals the leak: Sara Burskin. Informed of this discovery, Cordington agrees to kill her himself.

The discovery of the leak leads the resistance to abandon contact with Penny yet again, as the German security services are clearly aware of his participation in the resistance and hope by monitoring him they can discover the identity of other members. Penny is therefore surprised when Kennedy suddenly contacts him in July with a new mission: to smuggle out Otto Frisch, who the Gestapo has discovered knows information which could be vital to the development of a "superbomb". Travelling to Liverpool, they succeed in persuading Frisch to agree to escape. Avoiding discovery, Penny hides Frisch among the Jenner family, where he poses as a visiting relative. The Germans order a second round-up of the Jews, though, this time including native-born British citizens. Frisch is captured along with the Jenners, and Penny and Cordington travel to Imber in order to stage an escape from the concentration camp the Germans have built there.

Upon their return Cordington tells Penny about his plans to meet with a nearby resistance leader, followed by a trip to London for an upcoming conference to resistance leadership to be held during the Regent's re-coronation. After he leaves, Penny is sent to intercept him and to head-off an ill-advised ambush that threatens to draw in a nearby Waffen-SS unit. Penny arrives in time to save Cordington but not to stop the ambush, which leads the Germans and their British auxiliaries to massacre everyone in the nearby town of Merricombe in response. He returns with news of the massacre, which Kennedy quickly exploits for propaganda purposes. When they attempt to smuggle Frisch out of England, however, they are met by Sara, who is very much alive and who reveals that Cordington is in fact a double agent who was coerced into working with the Gestapo upon the discovery that his deceased mother was in fact Jewish. Killing Sara, Penny and Kennedy race to London to prevent Cordington from revealing the location of the resistance meeting to the Germans. Pursued by the authorities, they make it to London and warn the resistance, but they are unable to stop Cordington before he executes his real plan: using the credentials given to him by the Gestapo to get through security at the coronation and setting off a suicide bomb that kills the Regent and assembled German leadership. In the aftermath, the Germans retaliate by massacring over 100,000 people (including Penny's remaining family), triggering a nationwide rebellion that threatens the Germans' hold on their empire.

== Characters ==
Nick Penny - The main character, he was the German master of the local grammar school prior to becoming a sergeant in the Intelligence Corps during the war. His command of German led to his position as a translator and liaison for the German occupation leadership in the region.

Coral Kennedy - A member of the resistance, she is a highly trained and adept operative. "Coral Kennedy" is subsequently revealed to be an alias; her real name is Jennifer.

Roy Locke - A friend of Nick Penny and a former POW. The son of a local publican, he joins the resistance soon after his release and involves Nick in its operations.

Matty Cordington - A friend of Nick Penny and Roy Locke. The son of a wealthy local landowner, he was awarded the MC during the invasion. After his return from a POW camp he joins Nick and Roy in the resistance.

Generalleutnant Kurt von Glass - Provincial governor of the Westgau, the German-established province (gau) encompassing the West Country. A Prussian, he is not overtly supportive of the Nazis but is proud of his country's military achievements.

Standartenführer Stolz - The security chief of the Westgau, he is a cold blooded member of the SS who holds the British people in contempt and desires the destruction of the British resistance.

Joan Pendleton - Nick's sister, who was married to a Royal Navy officer before the war. He was killed in mid-1940 when his destroyer, HMS Greyhound went down fighting.

Margaret Penny - Nick's mother, who appears increasingly withdrawn from reality as a consequence of the losses she has suffered from the German invasion.

David Pendleton - Joan's naïve young son. He is very adventurous and eager to kill Germans.

John Mills - A former colonel in the British Army, he is a leading member of the resistance.

Sara Burskin - A Polish refugee who accompanies Matty Cordington upon his return from the POW camp. The two share a strained relationship and she is eager to be involved in resistance activities.

Jacob & Miriam Jenner - A Jewish couple who own a tea room in town. It was Jacob who first interested Nick Penny in the German language as a young boy.

Hubert Leech - A newsagent who profits from the war and occupation, taking advantage of Nazi persecutions of Jewish businesses to purchase the Jenners' tea room.

Hauptmann Hauser - Glass's aide-de-camp.

Sergeant Bliecher - A member of the Abwehr who tries to break up the local resistance.

== Awards ==
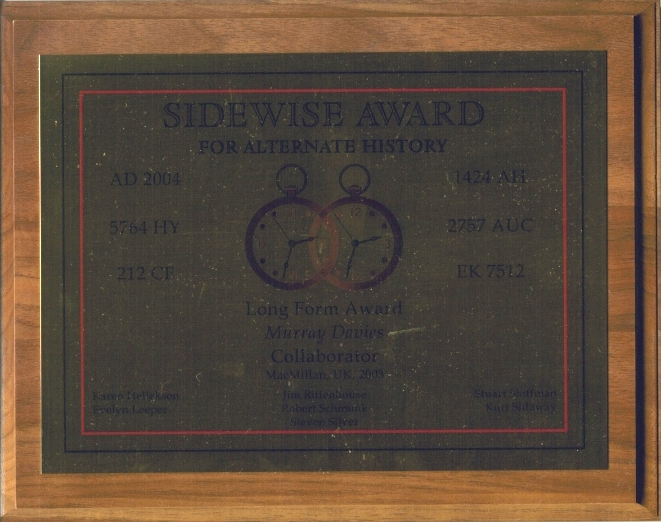
Sidewise Award for Murray Davies's novel Collaborator

Collaborator won the 2003 Sidewise Award for Alternate History.

== See also ==
- It Happened Here
- SS-GB
- Farthing (novel)
