= Leo Rutman =

American author and playwright

Leo Rutman is an American author and playwright. His novels are generally set in New York City during the twentieth century.

Rutman has received playwriting awards from Yale University, Brandeis University, and Columbia University. His published and produced plays include They Got Jack, Jesus is a Junkie, and Where is Che Guevara?.

== Bibliography ==
- Five Good Boys (1982)
- Spear of Destiny (1988)
- Clash of Eagles (1990)
- Thy Father's Son (2002)
