= Murray Davies =

Welsh author and journalist

- Born: 2 August 1947
- Died: 10 September 2014 (aged 67)
- Education: University College Wales, Aberystwyth
- Occupation: Writer
- Partner: Glenys Hughes
- Writing career
- Genre: Alternate history
- Notable work: Collaborator

Murray Davies (2 August 1947 – 10 September 2014) was a Welsh writer.

== Biography ==
=== Early life ===
Davies was born into a mining family in Caerleon, South Wales. He won a scholarship to UCW Aberystwyth where he studied international politics, followed by an MA in First World War poetry.

=== Career ===
Davies worked for the Daily Mail before joining the Daily Mirror as a reporter and feature writer in 1974.

In 1997 he became a novelist, writing alternate history stories. Davies' debut novel, The Drumbeat of Jimmy Sands, was published in 1999. He then wrote the four-part "In The Eye of the Storm" series between 2000 and 2005; the third installment, Collaborator, won the Sidewise Award for Alternate History in 2003. Davies then planned a new series and the first two novels, titled Welcome to Meantime and Bad Blood in Meantime, were planned to be published in 2014 and 2015 by Old Street Publishing. Welcome to Meantime was published shortly before his death in 2014, whilst Bad Blood in Meantime was published posthumously in 2016.

=== Death ===
Latterly, Davies suffered with illness before dying in 2014.

== Bibliography ==
- The Drumbeat of Jimmy Sands (1999)
- The Samson Option (2000)
- The Devil's Handshake (2002)
- Collaborator (2003)
- The Dogs in the Streets (2005) - re-released as Blood Lines in 2018
- Welcome to Meantime (2014)
- Bad Blood in Meantime (2016)
- The Undone Years (2018)
