= An Englishman's Castle =

1978 British television series

- Genre: Drama
- Written by: Philip Mackie
- Directed by: Paul Ciappessoni
- Starring: Kenneth More; Isla Blair; Anthony Bate; Kathleen Byron; Noel Dyson
- Country of origin: United Kingdom
- Original language: English
- No. of episodes: 3

Production
- Producer: Innes Lloyd
- Running time: 50 minutes
- Production company: BBC

Original release
- Network: BBC Two
- Release: 5 June – 19 June 1978

An Englishman's Castle is a three-part BBC television serial first broadcast in 1978, written by Philip Mackie and directed by Paul Ciappessoni. The story was set in an alternative history 1970s, in which Nazi Germany won World War II and England is run by a collaborationist fascist government. Peter Ingram (Kenneth More) is a writer for a soap opera (also called An Englishman's Castle), which is set in London in 1940, during the fictional Nazi invasion and subsequent occupation.

== Plot ==
Peter Ingram is a successful London screenwriter and the creator of one of the most popular television shows in Nazi-occupied Europe, An Englishman's Castle. The show is a period soap opera following an ordinary London family during an imagined German invasion of England in 1940. Ingram is initially oblivious to the reality of Nazi rule, which is hidden behind a façade of seemingly normal English daily life. The historical invasion was followed by several years of guerrilla warfare, which ended in a truce with Germany and an amnesty that enabled the resisters to resume normal daily life. In return, they accepted the reality of German occupation, generally feeling that further resistance was futile.

Ingram's show furthers this complacency among the population in the present day (1978) and is highly valued by the authorities. A superficial sense of normalcy has been restored, with few German soldiers visible on the streets. Instead, German rule is maintained mainly through an extensive system of collaborators known as "delators". When dissidents are detained, it is done by polite, soft-spoken English police officers who discreetly deliver them to hidden torture chambers out of sight.

Ingram gradually becomes aware of the true state of the regime. He encounters firm objections from his superiors when he attempts to include a character with a Jewish name in the series. Ingram argues that the series is largely based on his own life and that the Jewish man was a real friend. However, network executives state that having such a character would violate the official policy of keeping the extermination of the Jews entirely forgotten and never discussed openly. Ingram soon discovers that his mistress, Jill, who is one of the stars of his show, is secretly Jewish and a member of a clandestine resistance movement. Eventually, his loyalties are tested, and he sides with the resistance.

When the resistance decides to use his show's massive audience to broadcast a code word signaling a nationwide insurgency, he complies, allowing Jill to speak the phrase during filming. In the closing scene, he locks himself in his control studio as the episode is broadcast, cuts off the pre-recorded feed just before her scene airs, and speaks the phrase himself live over the air instead. As the sounds of a rebellion against the collaborationist government begin to echo through his office windows, Ingram awaits the arrival of the secret police. When someone finally breaks down the door, he turns to face the unseen intruder.

== Cast ==
- Kenneth More as Peter Ingram
- Isla Blair as Jill / "Sally"
- Anthony Bate as Harmer
- Kathleen Byron as Mrs Ingram
- Noel Dyson as Connie / "Mrs Worth"
- Rob Edwards as Adrian / "Bert Worth"
- Fiona Gray as Susan
- Nigel Havers as Mark Ingram
- Peter Hughes as John / "Mr Worth"
- David Meyer as Henry Ingram
- Frederick Treves as Lonsdale
- David Roy Paul as Head waiter
- Brian Peck as Jimmy
- Philip Bond as Inspector
- Anthony Stafford as Arthur / "Frank Worth"

== DVD ==
According to the DVD cover, the series was released by Simply Media and the BBC in 2015.

== See also ==
- Hypothetical Axis victory in World War II
