= SS-GB =

1978 alternative history by Len Deighton

- First Edition
- Author: Len Deighton
- Cover artist: Holly Macdonald
- Language: English
- Genre: Alternate history
- Publisher: Jonathan Cape
- Publication date: 24 August 1978
- Publication place: United Kingdom
- Media type: Hardcover
- Pages: 368
- ISBN: 978-0-224-01606-3

SS-GB is an alternative history novel by Len Deighton, set in the United Kingdom conquered and occupied by Germany during the Second World War. The novel's title refers to the branch of the Nazi SS that controls Britain. It was first published in 1978.

== Synopsis ==
=== Setting ===
SS-GB is set less than a year after the British surrender following a successful Operation Sea Lion. In 1940, the Germans landed near Ashford, and Canterbury was declared an open city. The German advance captured London, but a British rear guard around Colchester slowed down the Germans for long enough to enable Royal Navy ships to escape from Harwich. King George VI and Prime Minister Winston Churchill became prisoners of the Germans. The British gold and foreign reserves were shipped to Canada.

In 1941, the British Armed Forces surrendered, Churchill was tried by court-martial in Berlin and executed while the King was imprisoned in the Tower of London. Queen Elizabeth and her daughters Princess Elizabeth and Princess Margaret escaped to New Zealand while the Duke of Windsor escaped to The Bahamas. A naval officer, Rear Admiral Conolly Abel Smith, formed a British government-in-exile in Washington, DC but struggles to gain diplomatic recognition. Conolly is also forced to fight off an attempt by the Germans to take over the British embassy in Washington.

The United Kingdom still has an unidentified puppet Prime Minister and Parliament, but true power lies in the hands of the German Military Commander GB and the Military Administration Chief GB. Parliament has passed an "Emergency Powers (German Occupation) Act", giving the German authorities executive power over occupied Britain. There is also considerable interservice rivalry between the German Army, the Schutzstaffel and the Gestapo. Hitler held a victory parade in London while Hermann Göring and Joseph Goebbels were on board the first nonstop Lufthansa flight from London to New York City.

The Molotov–Ribbentrop Pact is still in force and the Soviet Navy was given bases at Rosyth, Scapa Flow and Invergordon. The German Propaganda Ministry claims that the Soviet-German friendship is genuine, but cynics claim that Hitler is using the Soviets to counterbalance the Americans. As part of the German-Soviet Friendship Week, Karl Marx's body is to be taken from Highgate Cemetery to the Soviet Union.

Franklin D. Roosevelt is still the US president and Joseph P. Kennedy the American ambassador. The United States is still officially neutral, the Roosevelt administration is seeking to acquire German atomic research from the Bringle Sands Atomic Research Establishment. The United States had also launched an amphibious invasion of the French colony of Martinique after it sided with the regime of Vichy France. British personnel who managed to escape the German occupation have also enlisted in the US Armed Forces.

=== Plot ===
In November 1941, nine months after a German invasion led to the British surrender, Douglas Archer is a detective-superintendent of London's Metropolitan Police Criminal Investigation Department at Scotland Yard who works on homicide crimes. His boss is SS Gruppenführer Fritz Kellermann, the German head of police forces in Britain. Having lost his wife, Jill, and his home during the German invasion, Archer lives with his son, "Douggie", at the home of Mrs. Sheenan and her son, Bob. Archer's colleagues are Detective-Sergeant Harry Woods and his secretary and lover, Sylvia Manning.

Archer is called to investigate the murder of a well-dressed man at a flat above an antiques shop in Shepherd Market. Although the body has two gunshot wounds, Archer is puzzled by its condition, particularly by what appears to be sunburn on the arm. Archer also finds a prosthetic arm and a return ticket to Bringle Sands, where the Germans have an atomic research facility. Despite stolen identification identifying the man as Peter Thomas, Archer discovers that the man's true identity is William Spode, a British atomic physicist in the German atomic program and secretly involved with the British Resistance.

Since the case is linked to the German atomic program, Berlin dispatches SS Standartenführer Oskar Huth, who arrives to supervise the investigation. Archer soon finds himself in the middle of a power struggle between Huth and Kellerman that is complicated by interservice rivalry between the SS, German Army, Gestapo and Abwehr. Archer becomes romantically involved with an attractive American journalist, Barbara Barga, who is connected to the British Resistance leader Colonel George Mayhew. He also learns that his colleagues Woods and Sylvia are also members of the British resistance.

During the course of the investigation, Archer foils a plot by Spode's brother and Resistance member John Spode to kidnap his son as part of an attempt to blackmail him. Archer travels to the British prisoner-of-war camp that produced the prosthetic limbs and captures John, who signs a confession but claims that William's death was a suicide. John then takes his own life with cyanide provided by an Abwehr officer Captain Hesse, who is under orders from his superiors to prevent him from divulging the German Army's atomic program to the rival SS.

Archer accompanies Hesse to a meeting with Mayhew and an Abwehr general, where he learns that the British Resistance and the German Army are conspiring to liberate King George VI from SS custody out of mutual interests. The British Resistance plan to smuggle him to the United States to shore up Rear-Admiral Conolly Abel Smith's Free British government in exile. Meanwhile, the Abwehr and the German Army want to embarrass the SS and to recover William's stolen atomic research. Archer later learns that the research is stored on a piece of film hidden in the prosthetic limb found at the flat.

Later, the British resistance bomb a "German-Soviet Friendship Week ceremony" to repatriate Karl Marx's remains from Highgate Cemetery. In response, the Germans impose martial law and detain thousands of Londoners, including Woods and Manning. Woods is detained by the Gestapo, and Sylvia is killed during an escape attempt. Kellerman uses his connections to secure Woods's release but forces him to sign a statement compromising Archer.

Archer passes the atomic research film to Mayhew. Together, they travel to an English countryside, where they rendezvous with the American agent Daniel Barga, Barbara's husband. Barga and Mayhew negotiate a deal for the Americans to allow the King to enter the US in return for receiving the German atomic research. Huth arrives to arrest the group, but Mayhew makes an agreement with him and departs.

The following day, Archer and Woods receive the comatose George VI from their German Army co-conspirators. They attempt to evacuate him to Bringle Sands in an ambulance, but it breaks down. Archer and Woods turn to Barbara for help, only to find that she has been killed by the Gestapo — who have made her death appear to be the result of a burglary gone wrong. With Mayhew's help, Archer and Woods manage to take the King to Bringle Sands to meet with a landing party of US Marines, led by Major Dodgson. Despite their efforts, the group is ambushed by Huth's SS forces and the King, Barga and Dodgson are killed. However, the King's rescue is a diversion for a larger American force to attack the Bringle Sands atomic research facility. The Americans obtain the facility's atomic research, equipment and several scientists during the raid, dealing a major blow to the German atomic research program.

Following the loss of Bringle Sands, Kellerman frames Huth for conspiring with Mayhew to rescue the King and allowing the Americans to attack Bringle Sands. Mayhew is pardoned in return for testifying against Huth at his trial. Archer is exonerated of any wrongdoing because of Huth and Woods's intervention. Before Huth's execution, Archer meets with him, and Huth reveals that Mayhew used the King's rescue attempt as a diversion for US forces to attack Bringle Sands. With the loss of Bringle Sands, Huth believes that the US will win the nuclear arms race. In addition, Huth reveals that Woods was Kellerman's informant, that Kellerman arranged Barbara's murder and that Mayhew struck a deal with Huth. Archer comes to realise that Mayhew killed Spode to prevent the Americans from gaining access to his atomic research. He also considers Mayhew as "playing God and writing the future history books". Rather than presenting the outside world with a pathetic and infirm exile King George, Mayhew deliberately arranged for the King to die a martyr's death alongside Americans, eventually bringing the US into war with Germany. Meanwhile, the 15-year-old Princess Elizabeth will be crowned in exile and travel to Washington, DC, to arouse sympathy for the British Resistance.

== Characters ==
- Douglas Archer. A 30-year-old Detective Superintendent in the Metropolitan Police, Archer is a widower with a young son named Douggie. Archer's wife, Jill, perished during the Blitz in London. A graduate of Oxford University, Archer is among a new generation of university-educated detectives who prefer scientific methods like forensic science. A highly respected detective, Archer is credited with solving several high-profile murder cases in London. Archer struggles to balance his detective work with the brutal realities of the Nazi occupation.
- Dr Oskar Huth. A Standartenführer from the Sicherheitsdienst (Security Service), the SS intelligence service. He speaks fluent English and studied at Oxford University. Huth has an antagonistic relationship with SS Gruppenführer Fritz Kellerman, whom he resents as an opportunistic political appointee, and his own father, a respected German professor. Huth is also privy to the German atomic research program, which is codenamed "Apocalypse". Huth takes charge of the investigation into William Spode's murder because of the physicist's involvement with the German atomic research establishment at Bringle Sands, near Devon. Huth strikes a deal with the British Resistance leader George Mayhew, who reveals the resistance plot to smuggle the King to the US, but it turns out to be a diversion for a US raid on Bringle Sands.
- Fritz Kellerman. An SS Gruppenführer who serves as the head of all British police forces, he seeks to bring it in line with the German police system. A plump man in his late fifties with a thick thatch of white hair who has a taste for good food and drink, Kellerman rose through the ranks of the Nazi Party as a political appointee. Kellerman likes his subordinates to refer to him as Vater (or father). Kellerman tries to ingratiate himself with Archer by offering his son, Douggie, a birthday present — a beautifully made model car from the Schuco toy factory in Nuremberg, along with a signed compliments slip — and securing a place at the German School in Highgate for the children of German officers and bureaucrats. A ruthless political player, Kellerman frames Huth for colluding with the British Resistance to free King George VI and destroy the Bringle Sands atomic research facility.
- Barbara Barga. An American syndicated journalist who writes for 42 US magazines and newspapers, she is the wife of Daniel Barga, a lieutenant commander in the US Navy. Barbara travelled to London on the inaugural Lufthansa flight from New York to London. While working on a story about Americans living in German-occupied London, Barbara secretly works with the British Resistance to obtain German atomic secrets for the Americans. She befriends Archer, and they develop a romantic relationship. Later in the novel, she is killed by the Gestapo under Kellerman's orders.
- Harry Woods. A detective sergeant in the Metropolitan Police. An "old school" policeman, Woods is scornful of paperwork, filing systems and microscopes. A First World War veteran, Woods is older than Archer, who looks up to him as a professional mentor. Woods and Archer first met in 1920 when Woods was a young police constable, and Archer was a nine-year-old boy. Woods has a wife, Joan Woods, but is secretly in love with the police secretary Sylvia Manning. Woods and Manning are involved with the British Resistance. Following a botched escape attempt, Woods strikes a deal with Kellerman and divulges the resistance's plot to rescue King George VI and smuggle him to the US.
- Jimmy Dunn. A young aspiring police constable in the Metropolitan Police. Archer tasks Dunn with investigating the itinerant music teacher John Spode. The investigation uncovers Spode's connection to the murdered atomic physicist William Spode, who was travelling under the pseudonym Peter Thomas, and both brothers' involvement in atomic research. Dunn is later murdered by the British Resistance, which strings up his body in Archer's former, bombed-out home as a warning.
- Sylvia Manning. A secretary working for the Metropolitan Police. Her parents perished during the German invasion, and she entered into a romantic relationship with Archer, who also lost his wife. Manning becomes involved with the British Resistance and steals several German identity documents from Scotland Yard. Manning and Woods are later arrested after the British Resistance bombs the German-Soviet Friendship Week ceremony to take Karl Marx's remains to the Soviet Union. Manning is later killed during a botched escape attempt from the Caledonian Market detention camp.
- Mrs Sheenan
- Bob Sheenan
- Dr John Spode
- Colonel George Mayhew

== In other media ==
=== Television ===
In November 2014, the BBC announced a five-episode mini-series, SS-GB, adapted from the novel by James Bond screenwriters Neal Purvis and Robert Wade. It was broadcast on BBC One between 19 February 2017 and 19 March 2017.

A new edition of the novel, with a cover photograph of Sam Riley as Douglas Archer, was also made available to tie-in with the transmission of the mini-series.

=== Mentions ===
Gavriel David Rosenfeld, a professor of history at Fairfield University, cited SS-GB in his book The World Hitler Never Made.

== See also ==
- Hypothetical Axis victory in World War II — includes an extensive list of other Wikipedia articles regarding works of Nazi Germany/Axis/World War II alternate history.
