= Gavriel D. Rosenfeld =

American historian

Gavriel David Rosenfeld
- Education: Brown University, UCLA
- Scientific career
- Fields: History, Judaic Studies
- Workplaces: Center for Jewish History, Fairfield University
- Website: http://gavrieldrosenfeld.com/

Gavriel David Rosenfeld (born 1967) is President of the Center for Jewish History in New York City and Professor of History at Fairfield University. His areas of academic specialization include the history of Nazi Germany, memory studies, and counterfactual history. He is an editor of The Journal of Holocaust Research and edits the blog The Counterfactual History Review, which features news, analysis, and commentary from the world of counterfactual and alternate history.

== Early life and education ==
Rosenfeld is the son of Alvin H. Rosenfeld, founder of the Robert A. and Sandra S. Borns Jewish Studies Program and Institute for the Study of Contemporary Antisemitism at Indiana University, and Erna B. Rosenfeld, former Area Coordinator for Indiana University Residence Life.

Rosenfeld graduated from Bloomington High School South in 1985. He received his B.A. in History and Judaic Studies from Brown University in 1989. Following a year studying at LMU Munich on a Fulbright-Hays Fellowship (1989–1990), he received his Ph.D. in History from UCLA in 1996. His sister, Dalia Rosenfeld, is a prize-winning fiction writer, editor, and translator based in Tel Aviv.

== Career ==
Since 2000, Rosenfeld has taught in the department of history at Fairfield University, where he offers courses on modern European History, German History, Holocaust History, Jewish History, Memory Studies, and Counterfactual History. He has written widely on how the memory of the Third Reich and Second World War has taken shape in Western culture—especially in architecture, monuments, literature, film, television, and historiography. In this work, he has emphasized how the memory of the Nazi era has become increasingly "normalized." Rosenfeld's 2015 book, Hi Hitler! How the Nazi Past is Being Normalized in Contemporary Culture (Cambridge University Press, 2015), won the German Studies Association's 2017 Sybil Halpern Milton Memorial Book Prize for the best book dealing with Nazi Germany and the Holocaust. His 2011 book, Building After Auschwitz: Jewish Architecture and the Memory of the Holocaust, which explores the origins of "new Jewish architecture," was a finalist for the National Jewish Book Award in the category of visual arts.

Rosenfeld has also been a leading scholar in the field of counterfactual history. His key works include The World Hitler Never Made: Alternate History and the Memory of Nazism (2005), What Ifs of Jewish History: From Abraham to Zionism (2016), and "The Ways We Wonder 'What If?": Towards a Typology of Historical Counterfactuals (2016). In 2013, he created a blog, The Counterfactual History Review, which provides regular commentary on the use of counterfactuals in Western intellectual and cultural life. His new, two-volume book Predicting the Past: Counterfactual History from Antiquity to the Present will appear in 2026.

Rosenfeld's current research focuses on the history and memory of fascism in the United States. His essays on the topic include "An American Führer? Nazi Analogies and the Struggle to Explain Donald Trump" (2019), "Donald Trump's Situational Fascism" (2021), "Beyond Fascism: Trumpism after Trump (2021), and the new volume, co-edited with Janet Ward, Fascism in America: Past and Present.

Rosenfeld has published dozens of essays and opinion pieces in such publications as The Washington Post, The Atlantic, The New Republic, The Forward, The Jewish Review of Books, The San Francisco Chronicle, The Hartford Courant, The History News Network, History Today, and The Conversation. Rosenfeld has been interviewed by, and had his work cited in, The New York Times, The Wall Street Journal, and The New Yorker, as well as programs on PBS and National Public Radio.

On September 1, 2022, Rosenfeld began his tenure as President of the Center for Jewish History in New York City. He has since worked to bolster the Center's reputation as the world's largest Jewish archive by expanding its fellowship program and public programming. In the fall of 2023, he took over the directorship of the CJH fellowship program, which has since been officially renamed the Institute for Advanced Research. In 2024, the Institute welcomed a cohort of ten fellows, ranging from senior scholars to PhD candidates. In April 2023, Rosenfeld helped launch the Jewish Public History Forum, which features major symposia on historical topics of contemporary relevance, including interwar Jewish response to Fascism, the American Jewish debate on Zionism, the role played by American Jews in immigration, and the uncertain place of Jews at American universities. He also co-curated the recent 2024 exhibition, "Between Antisemitism and Activism: The Jewish University Experience in Historical Perspective."

== Bibliography ==
=== Books ===
- Predicting the Past, Volume I: Counterfactual History from Antiquity to the French Revolution (DeGruyter, 2026).
- Predicting the Past, Volume II: Counterfactual History from Napoleon to the Present (DeGruyter, 2026).
- (Co-Editor with Janet Ward) Fascism in America: Past and Present (Cambridge University Press, 2023).
- The Fourth Reich: The Specter of Nazism from World War II to the Present (Cambridge University Press, 2019).
- (Editor) What Ifs of Jewish History: From Abraham to Zionism (Cambridge University Press, 2016).
- Hi Hitler! How the Nazi Past is Being Normalized in Contemporary Culture (Cambridge University Press, 2015).
- Building after Auschwitz: Jewish Architecture and the Memory of the Holocaust (New Haven: Yale University Press, 2011).
- (Co-Editor with Paul Jaskot) Beyond Berlin: Twelve German Cities Confront the Nazi Past (Ann Arbor: University of Michigan Press, 2008).
- The World Hitler Never Made: Alternate History and the Memory of Nazism (Cambridge, UK: Cambridge University Press, 2005).
- Munich and Memory: Architecture, Monuments and the Legacy of the Third Reich (Berkeley: University of California Press, 2000).

=== Articles ===
- Rosenfeld, Gavriel (December 2002). "Why do we ask 'What if?' : reflections on the function of alternate history". History and Theory. 41 (4): 90–103.
