= Stephen Baxter bibliography =

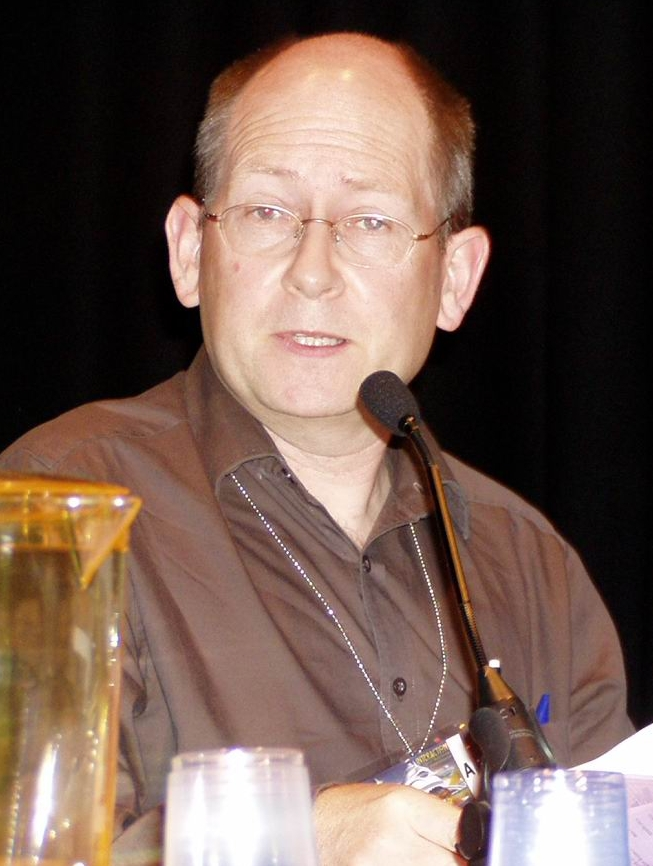
Baxter in 2005

This is the complete bibliography of British science fiction author Stephen Baxter.

== Xeelee Sequence ==
| Title | Year | ISBN | Notes |
|---|---|---|---|
| Raft | 1991 | ISBN 0-246-13706-1 | Nominated for the Arthur C. Clarke Award and the Locus Award for Best First Novel, 1992 |
| Timelike Infinity | 1992 | ISBN 0-00-224016-5 | |
| Flux | 1993 | ISBN 0-00-224025-4 | |
| Ring | 1994 | ISBN 0-00-224026-2 | |
| Vacuum Diagrams | 1997 | ISBN 0-00-225425-5 | Philip K. Dick Award winner, 1999 Short story collection. |
| Reality Dust | 2000 | ISBN 1-902880-10-2 ISBN 1-902880-11-0 | Novella (first published by PS Publishing as trade paperback and hardcover; both limited; later collected in Resplendent) |
| Riding the Rock | 2002 | ISBN 1-902880-60-9 ISBN 1-902880-59-5 | Novella (first published by PS Publishing as trade paperback and hardcover; both limited; later collected in Resplendent) |
| Mayflower II | 2004 | ISBN 1-904619-16-9 ISBN 1-904619-17-7 | Novella (first published by PS Publishing as trade paperback and hardcover; both limited; later collected in Resplendent) |
| Starfall | 2009 | ISBN 978-1-906301-59-0 ISBN 978-1-906301-60-6 | Novella (first published by PS Publishing as hardcover and jacketed hardcover; both limited; later collected in Xeelee: Endurance) |
| Gravity Dreams | 2011 | ISBN 978-1-848631-89-2 ISBN 978-1-848631-90-8 (signed edition) | Novella (first published by PS Publishing as hardcover and signed hardcover; both limited; later collected in Xeelee: Endurance) |
| Xeelee: Endurance | 2015 | ISBN 978-1-473212-70-1 | Collection of short stories and novellas. |
| Xeelee: Vengeance | 2017 | ISBN 978-1-473217-19-5 | |
| Xeelee: Redemption | 2018 | ISBN 978-1-473217-21-8 | |

=== Destiny's Children ===
The Destiny's Children series is part of the Xeelee Sequence.

| Title | Year | ISBN | Notes |
|---|---|---|---|
| Coalescent | 2003 | ISBN 0-345-45786-2 | Arthur C. Clarke Award nominee, 2004 |
| Exultant | 2004 | ISBN 0-345-45788-9 | |
| Transcendent | 2005 | ISBN 0-345-45792-7 | John W. Campbell Memorial Award nominee, 2006 |
| Resplendent | 2006 | ISBN 0-575-07896-0 | Collection of short stories and novellas. |

== NASA Trilogy ==
| Title | Year | ISBN | Notes |
|---|---|---|---|
| Voyage | 1996 | ISBN 0-00-648037-3 | Arthur C. Clarke Award nominee, 1997 |
| Titan | 1997 | ISBN 0-06-105713-4 | Arthur C. Clarke Award nominee, 1998 |
| Moonseed | 1998 | ISBN 0-06-105903-X | |

== The Web Series ==
Baxter contributed two books to this series for young adults. See The Web (series)

== Manifold Trilogy ==
| Title | Year | ISBN | Notes |
|---|---|---|---|
| Manifold: Time | 1999 | ISBN 0-345-43076-X | Arthur C. Clarke Award nominee, 2000 |
| Manifold: Space | 2000 | ISBN 0-345-43077-8 | |
| Manifold: Origin | 2001 | ISBN 0-345-43079-4 | |
| Phase Space | 2002 | ISBN 0-00-651185-6 | Short story collection. |

== Mammoth Trilogy ==
| Title | Year | ISBN | Notes |
|---|---|---|---|
| Silverhair | 1999 | ISBN 0-06-105132-2 | Young adult |
| Longtusk | 1999 | ISBN 0-380-81898-1 | Young adult |
| Icebones | 2001 | ISBN 0-380-81899-X | Young adult |
| Behemoth | 2004 | ISBN 0-575-07604-6 | Omnibus edition of the Mammoth Trilogy |

== A Time Odyssey (co-authored with Arthur C. Clarke) ==
| Title | Year | ISBN | Notes |
|---|---|---|---|
| Time's Eye | 2003 | ISBN 0-345-45248-8 | |
| Sunstorm | 2005 | ISBN 0-345-45250-X | |
| Firstborn | 2007 | ISBN 978-0-345-49157-2 | |

== Time's Tapestry ==
| Title | Year | ISBN | Notes |
|---|---|---|---|
| Emperor | 2006 | ISBN 0-575-07432-9 | |
| Conqueror | 2007 | ISBN 0-575-07673-9 | |
| Navigator | 2007 | ISBN 978-0-441-01559-7 | |
| Weaver | 2008 | ISBN 978-0-575-08204-5 | |

== Flood/Ark ==
| Title | Year | ISBN | Notes |
|---|---|---|---|
| Flood | 2008 | ISBN 978-0-575-08058-4 | British Science Fiction Association Award nominee, 2008 |
| Ark | 2009 | ISBN 978-0-575-08057-7 | |
| Landfall | 2015 | ISBN 978-1-938-26318-7 | |

== Northland Trilogy ==
| Title | Year | ISBN | Notes |
|---|---|---|---|
| Stone Spring | 2010 | ISBN 978-0-575-08919-8 | |
| Bronze Summer | 2011 | ISBN 978-0-575-08923-5 | |
| Iron Winter | 2012 | ISBN 978-0-575-08928-0 | |

== The Long Earth (co-authored with Terry Pratchett) ==
| Title | Year | ISBN | Notes |
|---|---|---|---|
| The Long Earth | 2012 | ISBN 978-0-857-52009-8 | Co-authored with Terry Pratchett |
| The Long War | 2013 | ISBN 978-0-06-206777-7 | Co-authored with Terry Pratchett |
| The Long Mars | 2014 | ISBN 978-0-857-52175-0 | Co-authored with Terry Pratchett |
| The Long Utopia | 2015 | ISBN 978-0062297334 | Co-authored with Terry Pratchett |
| The Long Cosmos | 2016 | ISBN 978-0062297372 | Co-authored with Terry Pratchett |

== Proxima ==
| Title | Year | ISBN | Notes |
|---|---|---|---|
| Proxima | 2013 | ISBN 978-0575116849 | Science Fiction |
| Ultima | 2014 | ISBN 978-0575116870 | Science Fiction |

== World Engines ==
| Title | Year | ISBN | Notes |
|---|---|---|---|
| World Engines: Destroyer | 2019 | ISBN 978-1473223172 | In the near future Earth has recovered from the climate crisis. But in the far future an inexorable threat approaches, itself a relic of the deep past, and of the World Engines that created the planets. |
| World Engines: Creator | 2020 | ISBN 978-1473223226 | Trapped on an alternate Earth, the combined crews of a crashed Russian spaceship, a British expeditionary force and a group of strays from the future must work together to survive, escape, and discover what led them to this point. |

== Standalone novels ==
| Title | Year | ISBN | Notes |
|---|---|---|---|
| Anti-Ice | 1993 | ISBN 0-06-105421-6 | Alternate history |
| The Time Ships | 1995 | ISBN 0-06-105648-0 | BSFA Award winner, 1995; John W. Campbell Award winner, 1996; Philip K. Dick Award winner, 1996; Hugo, Locus, Clarke, and British Fantasy Awards nominee, 1996 Alternate history. An authorised sequel to H. G. Wells's The Time Machine. |
| The Light of Other Days | 2000 | ISBN 0-312-87199-6 | Co-authored with Arthur C. Clarke. |
| Evolution | 2002 | ISBN 0-345-45783-8 | |
| The H-Bomb Girl | 2007 | ISBN 0-571-23279-5 | Young adult |
| Doctor Who: The Wheel of Ice | 2012 | ISBN 978-1-445-89803-2 | Doctor Who novel |
| The Medusa Chronicles | 2016 | ISBN 1481479679 | Co-authored with Alastair Reynolds; sequel to Arthur C. Clarke's A Meeting with Medusa. |
| The Massacre of Mankind | 2017 | ISBN 978-1473205093 | An authorised sequel to H. G. Wells's The War of the Worlds. |
| Galaxias | 2021 | ISBN 978-1-473-22885-6 | "What would you do if the Sun went out? In this standalone novel, a near-future Earth faces a devastating cosmic intervention." |
| The Thousand Earths | 2022 | ISBN 978-1-473-22890-0 | "An exploration of deep time, two stories intertwined spanning five billion years." |
| Creation Node | 2023 | ISBN 978-1-473-22895-5 | |
| Fortress Sol | 2024 | ISBN 978-1-399-61461-0 | |
| Hearthspace | 2025 | ISBN 978-1-399-61468-9 | |
| Galaxy Engines | 2027 | ISBN 978-1-399-61471-9 | |

== Unrelated collections ==
| Title | Year | ISBN | Notes |
|---|---|---|---|
| Traces | 1998 | ISBN 0-00-649814-0 | Short story collection. |
| The Hunters of Pangaea | 2004 | ISBN 1-886778-49-3 | 18 stories and five essays on science and science fiction. |
| Obelisk | 2016 | ISBN 978-1-473-21274-9 | Collection of 17 stories, four of which are set in the Proxima/Ultima universe. |

== Short fiction ==
| Title | Year | First published in | Reprinted in |
|---|---|---|---|
| "The Star Boat" | 1989 | In the Warhammer set collection 'Ignorant Armies' (one of a List of Warhammer Fantasy novels) | |
| "The Saddle Point Sequence" | 1996 | Science Fiction Age (Jul 1996) | |
| "Last Contact" | 2007 | The Solaris Book of New Science Fiction | |
| "Formidable Caress" | 2009 | Analog 129/12 (Dec 2009) | The Best Science Fiction and Fantasy of the Year : Volume Four, ed. Jonathan Strahan (Night Shade Books, 2010) |
| "Return to Titan" | 2010 | Godlike Machines, Jonathan Strahan, ed. | The Year's Best Science Fiction: Twenty-eighth Annual Collection, Gardner Dozois, ed., (St. Martin's Griffin, NY, 2011) |
| "The Invasion of Venus" | 2010 | Engineering Infinity, edited by Jonathan Strahan | |
| "Going Up the Blue" | 2019 | Scarlet Traces: An Anthology Based on War of the Worlds | |

== Non-fiction ==
| Title | Year | ISBN | Notes |
|---|---|---|---|
| Deep Future | 2001 | ISBN 0575071958 | Science based examination of possible human futures. |
| Omegatropic | 2001 | ISBN 0-9540788-1-0 | Mainly science fiction criticism. |
| Revolutions in the Earth | 2003 (UK) | ISBN 0-297-82975-0 | James Hutton and the True Age of the World |
| Ages in Chaos | 2004 (United States) | ISBN 0-7653-1238-7 | James Hutton and the Discovery of Deep time |
| The Science of Avatar | 2011 | ISBN 0-297-86343-6 | Examines the concepts used in the 2009 film Avatar. |
