= Raft (novel) =

1991 novel by Stephen Baxter

- First edition
- Author: Stephen Baxter
- Cover artist: Chris Moore
- Language: English
- Series: Xeelee Sequence
- Genre: Hard science fiction
- Publisher: Grafton Books (UK)
- Publication date: 1991
- Publication place: United Kingdom
- Media type: Print
- Pages: 264
- ISBN: 0-246-13706-1
- OCLC: 28292571
- LC Class: PR6052.A849 R3 1991
- Followed by: Timelike Infinity

Raft is a 1991 hard science fiction book by British writer Stephen Baxter. Raft is both Baxter's debut novel and the first book in the Xeelee Sequence, although the Xeelee are not present. Raft was nominated for the Arthur C. Clarke Award in 1992.

== Setting ==
The novel is an elaborated version of his 1989 short story of the same title. The story follows a group of humans who have accidentally entered an alternate universe where the gravitational force is far stronger than our own, a "billion" times as strong. Planets do not exist, as they would immediately collapse under their own gravity; stars are only a mile across and have extremely brief life-spans, becoming cooled kernels a hundred yards wide with a surface gravity of five g. Human bodies possess a "respectable" gravity field in and of themselves. "Gravitic chemistry" also exists, where gravity is the dominant force on an atomic scale.

== Plot summary ==
The few thousand humans survive in a nebula of relatively breathable air, existing in divided communities. The society is highly stratified, with the elite living on the "Raft" (the remains of the starship that contains almost all the high technology), workers/miners living on various "Belt" worlds (where they mine burned-out star kernels), and the "Boneys", a nomadic band of "unmentionables" who live on worlds created out of corpses.

It is not directly detailed how humans came to the universe, but hints within the story indicate that the Raft ship came through a rift in our universe into this alternate reality. The original short story, also by Stephen Baxter, provides more insight as to how humans arrived, "five hundred years ago a great warship – chasing some forgotten opponent – blundered through a portal. A gateway. It left its own universe and arrived here." A glimpse of the high-gravity universe is seen in the book Ring, implying that the humans in Raft came from the main universe of the Xeelee Sequence, although during which time period they escaped is not clear.

The alternate universe the humans live in follows the same laws as our universe, except that it has a gravitational constant which is orders of magnitude larger than our own universe.

The physics of the alternate universe have slowly turned the nebula into an increasingly hostile environment and the humans, along with the bizarre native species, are suffering the effects of environmental collapse.
