= Traces (book) =

1998 collection of short stories by Stephen Baxter

- First edition
- Author: Stephen Baxter
- Cover artist: Chris Moore
- Language: English
- Genre: Science fiction
- Publisher: Voyager
- Publication date: 20 April 1998
- Publication place: United Kingdom
- Media type: Print (Paperback)

Traces is a collection of short stories written by British sci-fi author Stephen Baxter.The stories present alternate presents and futures, showing what life may have been like if history had gone differently. Unlike similar collections such as Vacuum Diagrams and Phase Space, it is not related to any particular series by Baxter (as, for example, Vacuum Diagrams is related to his Xeelee Sequence).

The book contains the following short stories:

- "Traces" (1991)
- "Darkness" (1995)
- "The Droplet" (1989)
- "No Longer Touch the Earth" (1993)
- "Mittelwelt" (1993)
- "Journey to the King Planet" (1990)
- "The Jonah Man" (1989)
- "Downstream" (1993)
- "The Blood of Angels" (1994)
- "Columbiad" (1996)
- "Brigantia's Angels" (1995)
- "Weep for the Moon" (1992)
- "Good News" (1994)
- "Something for Nothing" (1988)
- "In the Manner of Trees" (1992)
- "Pilgrim 7" (1993)
- "Zemlya" (1997)
- "Moon Six" (1997)
- "George and the Comet" (1991)
- "Inherit the Earth" (1992)
- "In the MSOB" (1996)
- "Afterword(Traces)" (1998, essay)
