= Transcendent (novel) =

2005 novel by Stephen Baxter

- First edition
- Author: Stephen Baxter
- Cover artist: EkhornForss
- Language: English
- Series: Destiny's Children
- Genre: Science fiction novel
- Publisher: Gollancz/Orion
- Publication date: October 2005
- Publication place: United Kingdom
- Media type: Print (hardback & paperback) ebook
- Pages: 489 pp
- ISBN: 0-575-07430-2
- OCLC: 58478602
- Dewey Decimal: 823/.914 22
- LC Class: PR6052.A849 T74 2005
- Preceded by: Exultant
- Followed by: Resplendent

Transcendent is the third novel in the Destiny's Children series by Stephen Baxter, and a 2006 Campbell Award nominee.

== Plot summary ==
The story alternates between two timelines: the world of Michael Poole in the year 2047, and that of Alia, a posthuman girl who lives approximately half a million years in the future.

Engineer Michael Poole is recovering from the death of Morag, his pregnant wife. Poole works as a consultant designing space propulsion systems, and dreams of being able to one day explore the stars. However, there are more pressing matters; humanity faces a serious bottleneck, with the Earth reeling from the effects of anthropogenic climate change and resource depletion; automobile production has all but ceased, except for hydrogen-based mass transit, and air travel is limited to the very rich. Due to climate change, the oceans have become dead zones, with rising sea levels and severe weather displacing millions.

While working in Siberia, Michael's son Tom is injured by an explosion of methane gas from previously frozen hydrates, suddenly released from the now-melting tundra. Michael begins to research whether this is an isolated incident or the beginning of something more serious. With the help of an artificial sentience named Gea, he discovers that a potential release of all such frozen greenhouse gasses could destabilise the environment enough to make the Earth untenable for human habitation, in a repeat of the Permian extinction.

Michael consults members of the Poole family, who come together to work on the problem. Tom, John, and the elderly George (a principal character of Coalescent) reunite, and a maverick geoengineering company funds the project. Michael designs a subsurface refrigeration system that could stabilise the frozen hydrates. Meanwhile, Michael continues to be haunted by visions of his dead wife, apparitions he has been seeing his entire life, even before he first met her. He becomes obsessed with discovering the origin of this phenomenon, and his quest for answers drives a wedge between him and his family. Aunt Rosa Poole (from Coalescent), a Catholic priest and ex-member of the Order, helps Michael research the problem, drawing on her vast knowledge, stemming in small part from her relationship with the Coalescent hive and its historical archives. The rest of the Poole family joins the investigation when Morag appears during a trial test of the engineering project. This time, everyone sees Morag, even observing drones recording the event. After the project is bombed by a terrorist group, Morag goes from being an apparition to reincarnating in physical reality. This frightens everyone, even Michael.

500,000 years in the future, the Nord, a generation ship, sails through the galaxy carrying Alia, a young girl, and her family. As part of a government program called the "Redemption", Alia is obligated to witness the life of Michael Poole, from start to finish. Pressured by her family to leave the ship, Alia becomes a candidate for the Transcendence, a collective group of immortal posthumans who are attempting to evolve into a form of godhood, in effect leaving their humanity behind. After travelling the galaxy and observing several posthuman life forms, Alia travels to Earth to meet the Transcendence. Alia learns the Transcendence is attempting to redeem the past suffering of all humans, first by witnessing every single one as Alia witnessed, then by living as every single human and experiencing everything that they experienced. However, since observing is not seen as sufficient for redemption, the Transcendence ultimately desires to erase all suffering in the past, thereby ensuring that every human that could have existed does so. Lastly, if that is seen as too great a task, the Transcendence is prepared to reach back in time and stop humans from ever existing, thereby "erasing" the suffering that they intend to redeem.

Upset about the goals of the Transcendence, Alia makes her way back to the Nord, only to find that it has been attacked in an attempt to get her to go back and face the Transcendence by a group who believes the Redemption is a mistake. Upon returning to the Transcendence, Alia agrees to find a human who can join the Transcendence long enough to debate the Redemption and help them find the best course of action. To do so, Alia projects herself into the past, to the time of Michael Poole. She appears to him as his dead wife, but changes into her true form, that of a different small, hairy primate, a form evolved for low gravity environments.

Alia convinces Michael to face the Transcendence. After an initial period of adjustment Michael makes contact with the Transcendence. Able to see both sides of the argument, Michael forgives the Transcendence for their meddling, but asks that they stop their efforts. Michael is returned to his own time, where he successfully completes the refrigeration project. The Kuiper anomaly, first introduced in Coalescent, disappears, and is revealed to be related to Alia's connection with Michael, having first appeared in the Solar System at the time of Michael's birth. In the far future, the Transcendence collapses and the Witnessing program is shut down.

== Publication information ==
- Transcendent. London: Gollancz/Orion, 2005. ISBN 0-575-07430-2, 489pp, Hardcover
- Transcendent. London: Gollancz/Orion, Oct 2005, ISBN 0-575-07431-0, 489pp, Trade paperback
- Transcendent. New York: Del Rey/Ballantine, Nov 2005. ISBN 0-345-45791-9, 488 pp, Hardcover
- Transcendent. New York: Del Rey/Ballantine, Dec 2005, ISBN 0-345-45793-5, ebook
- Transcendent. New York: Del Rey/Ballantine, Jan 2006, ISBN 0-345-45792-7, 505pp, Paperback
- Transcendent. New York: Del Rey/Ballantine, Jan 2006, SFBC #1194781, 488pp, Hardcover
- Transcendent. London: Gollancz/Orion, Sep 2006, ISBN 0-575-07814-6, 522pp, Paperback
- Transzendenz. München, Germany: Heyne Verlag, Sep 2006, ISBN 978-3-453-52189-6, 704 pp, Paperback (German edition)
