= Blueshift (disambiguation) =

In astronomy, a blueshift is a decrease in electromagnetic wavelength caused by the motion of a celestial object toward an observer.

Blueshift or blue shift may also refer to:

- Blue Shift (album), a 1990 album by Clarion Fracture Zone
- "Blue Shift", a song by Hawkwind from their 1993 album Electric Tepee
- "Blue Shift", a song by Lemaitre
- Blueshift, an unreleased album by Splashdown
- "Blue Shift" (short story), a science fiction short story by Stephen Baxter
- Blueshifting, an information technology term defined in Redshift (theory)
- Blue shift (molecule) (a.k.a. "hypsochromic shift"), a change in spectral band position in a spectrum of a molecule to a shorter wavelength
- Blue shift (politics), in American politics, an observed phenomenon under which mail-in votes trend towards the Democratic Party

== See also ==
- Doppler effect
- Half-Life: Blue Shift, an expansion for the computer game Half-Life
- Redshift
