= Gulliverzone =

1997 novel by Stephen Baxter

The Web: Gulliverzone
- First edition (publ. Orion)
- Author: Stephen Baxter
- Language: English
- Publication date: 1997

The Web: Gulliverzone is a 1997 young adult novel by Stephen Baxter.

The novel's title is a reference to a key theme park in the book, which is based on Jonathan Swift's Gulliver's Travels.

On behalf of BookPage, Colleen Cahill called GulliverZone "exciting", noting that it "is especially good for those interested in computers and virtual reality". Locus and Interzone also reviewed the novel.
