= Moon Six =

1997 short story by Stephen Baxter

"Moon Six" is a science fiction short story by British writer Stephen Baxter. It originally appeared in Science Fiction Age in the March 1997 issue.

"Moon Six" concerns an American astronaut named Bado. During a visit to the moon, Bado witnesses a sort of "heat haze," and then finds himself in an alternate reality. This happens numerous times during the story. These shifts cause various circumstances to change for Bado throughout the story, including the disappearance of his spacecraft, the disappearance of a fellow astronaut, the appearance of other space travellers, and eventually his release back into a society with a history different from the history he knows.

The narrative has two threads. One narrative proceeds as described above, with Bado enduring various shifts into different realities. The second thread portrays Bado as existing in an alternate United States of the late twentieth century, in a country (and world) which is experiencing a slower rate of technological growth than Bado has experienced. Bado uses materials and technologies borrowed from his spacesuit to obtain patents and earn himself a small fortune. However, Bado's unique experiences and knowledge are of limited use in a world where he has little influence.

"Moon Six" was a nominee for the Hugo Award for the best novelette in 1998.
