= Vacuum Diagrams =

1997 collection of science fiction short stories by Stephen Baxter

- First edition
- Author: Stephen Baxter
- Cover artist: Chris Moore
- Language: English
- Series: Xeelee Sequence
- Genre: Science fiction
- Published: 1997 (Voyager/UK)
- Publication place: United Kingdom
- Media type: Print (Paperback)
- ISBN: 0-00-225425-5
- OCLC: 37126918
- Dewey Decimal: 823/.914 21
- LC Class: PR6052.A849 V33 1997
- Preceded by: Ring
- Followed by: Reality Dust

Vacuum Diagrams is a collection of science fiction short stories by British writer Stephen Baxter. The collection connects the novels of the Xeelee Sequence and also shows the history of mankind in the Xeelee universe, and ultimately the universe. While each short story in the collection is self-contained, the stories are presented as being contained in the context of the first story, "Eve", about a man (seemingly Jack Raoul from the portion of the timeline concerned with the Silver Ghosts) who is forced to witness the events in the short stories by a god-like being. "Eve" acts as a structure for the short stories, with an introduction at the beginning of Vacuum Diagrams, short scenes occurring between each "era" (with "Eve" character explaining and introducing the next section), and an ending that wraps up the plot for the "Eve" story itself. Vacuum Diagrams won the Philip K. Dick Award in 1999.

At the end of the collection, a chronology of the Xeelee Sequence is provided. Every short story and book from the cycle (up to 1997) is noted, with notable events from each story plotted.

"Vacuum Diagrams" is also the title of the fifteenth short story in this collection. It was originally published in Interzone in 1990. The title "Vacuum Diagrams" refers to the violation and reassertion of the uncertainty principle in our universe. Set in A.D. 21124, the story concerns the main character's attempt and failure to terraform a colony due to its upset of the agenda of the galactic-scale builders known as the Xeelee.

== Collection contents ==
Vacuum Diagrams contains the following stories (all previously published except for "Eve"):

- Prologue: Eve
- Era: Expansion
  - "The Sun-People" (published 1993)
  - "The Logic Pool" (1994)
  - "Gossamer" (1995)
  - "Cilia-of-Gold" (1994)
  - "Lieserl" (1993)
- Era: Squeem Occupation
  - "Pilot" (1993)
  - "The Xeelee Flower" (1987)
  - "More Than Time or Distance" (1988)
  - "The Switch" (1990)
- Era: Qax Occupation
  - "Blue Shift" (1989)
  - "The Quagma Datum" (1989)
  - "Planck Zero" (1992)
- Era: Assimilation
  - "The Gödel Sunflowers" (1992)
  - "Vacuum Diagrams" (1990)
- Era: The War to End Wars
  - "Stowaway" (1991)
  - "The Tyranny of Heaven" (1990)
  - "Hero" (1995)
- Era: Flight
  - "Secret History" (1991)
- Era: Photino Victory
  - "Shell" (1987)
  - "The Eighth Room" (1989)
  - "The Baryonic Lords" (1991)
- Epilogue: Eve

== Versions in other languages ==
There is a Japanese version.
