= Xeelee Sequence =

Science fiction series by Stephen Baxter

- Author: Stephen Baxter
- Original title: Xeelee Sequence
- Country: United Kingdom
- Language: English
- Genre: Hard science fiction
- Published: 1991–2018
- Media type: Print (Hardcover / Paperback)
- No. of books: 12 (List of books)

The Xeelee Sequence (/ˈziːliː/; ZEE-lee) (Note: Baxter cites the pronunciation "ch-ee-lee" in Xeelee: Vengeance (2007).) is a series of hard science fiction novels, novellas, and short stories written by British author Stephen Baxter. The series spans billions of years of fictional history, exploring humanity's future expansion into the universe, its intergalactic war with the Xeelee, a supremely advanced Kardashev Type V alien civilization, and the Xeelee's own conflict with dark matter entities known as Photino Birds. The Xeelee are described as symbiotic entities composed of spacetime defects, Bose–Einstein condensates, and baryonic matter.

== Overview ==
As of August 2018, the series comprises nine novels and 53 shorter works, including short stories and novellas (most collected in three anthologies). All are set within a fictional chronology that spans from the Big Bang to the eventual heat death of the universe and the singularity portrayed in Timelike Infinity. An omnibus edition of the first four novels (Raft, Timelike Infinity, Flux, and Ring), entitled Xeelee: An Omnibus, was released in January 2010. In August 2016, the entire series of novels and stories (up to that date) was released in a single e-book volume, Xeelee Sequence: The Complete Series. Baxter's Destiny's Children series is also part of the Xeelee Sequence.

=== Conception ===
Baxter first conceived of the Xeelee while writing a short story in the summer of 1986 as a hobby (eventually published in Interzone as "The Xeelee Flower" the following year). He introduced powerful off-stage aliens to explain the story's titular artifact. In developing the backstory, he began to outline the elements that would later define the Sequence: a universe populated by intelligent species living in the shadow of the incomprehensible Xeelee.

=== Setting and themes ===
The series introduces several notable species and civilizations, including the Squeem, a group-mind aquatic species; the Qax, whose biology depends on the interactions of convection cells; and the Silver Ghosts, colonies of symbiotic organisms encased in reflective skins.

Several stories explore humans and posthumans in extreme environments: at the heart of a neutron star (Flux), in a parallel universe where gravity is much stronger (Raft), and within eusocial hive societies (Coalescent).

The Xeelee Sequence explores numerous ideas from theoretical physics and futurology, including artificial wormholes, time travel, exotic-matter physics, naked singularities, closed timelike curves, multiple universes, advanced computing and artificial intelligence, faster-than-light travel, spacetime engineering, quantum wave function entities, and the higher levels of the Kardashev scale.

Thematically, the series addresses existential and philosophical issues such as the struggle for survival in an unknowable universe, the impact of war and militarism on society, and the consequences of an unpredictable technological future for humanity.

== Plot summary ==
The overarching plot of the Xeelee Sequence involves an intergalactic war between humanity and the Xeelee, as well as a cosmic conflict between the Xeelee and the Photino Birds. Both are alien species that originated in the early universe. The technologically advanced Xeelee inhabit supermassive black holes, manipulating their event horizons to create habitats, construction materials, tools, and computing devices. The Photino Birds are a species based on dark matter that live in the gravity wells of stars. Because dark matter interacts only weakly with normal matter, they are likely unaware of baryonic life. To avoid losing their habitats to supernovae and stellar evolution, the Photino Birds interfere with nuclear fusion in stellar cores, prematurely aging stars into stable white dwarfs. These dwarfs provide long-lasting refuges for the Birds, but at the expense of other forms of life on surrounding planets. Their activities also halt the formation of new black holes by preventing Type II supernovae, thereby threatening the Xeelee and their cosmic projects.

After enduring several brutal occupations by alien civilizations, humanity expands into the galaxy with a xenophobic and militaristic outlook, seeking to eradicate other species. Humans eventually become the second-most advanced and widespread civilization in the Milky Way, after the Xeelee. Unaware of the war between the Photino Birds and the Xeelee, and its cosmic stakes, humanity wrongly concludes that the Xeelee are a sinister threat to their hegemony. Through a long war of attrition, humans contain the Xeelee to the galactic core. Both sides use time travel and closed timelike curves as war tactics, producing a stalemate that lasts thousands of years. Eventually, humanity develops defensive, movable pocket universes to safeguard information and an exotic weapon capable of destabilizing the core’s supermassive black hole. After the first successful strike, the Xeelee abruptly withdraw from the galaxy, ceding the Milky Way to human control.

Over the next 100,000 years, humanity continues to advance technologically, becoming a Type III civilization. They spread across the Local Group of galaxies and wage further wars against the Xeelee. However, even at this peak, humans remain a minor distraction, unable to meaningfully challenge Xeelee dominance across the wider universe.

Although the Xeelee master space and time and can even influence their own evolution, they ultimately fail to stop the Photino Birds. Instead, they construct a colossal ring-like structure made of cosmic strings. This construction, known as Bolder’s Ring (or simply "the Ring"), enables escape to other universes. Despite their aloofness and superiority, the Xeelee show compassion toward younger species. For example, they create a tailored universe for the nearly extinct Silver Ghosts, and they allow humans to use the Ring despite their long hostility.

== Novels ==
=== Xeelee Sequence (1991–2018) ===
Not all printings included volume number.

No.	Title	Publisher	Date	ISBN	Notes
1	Raft	Grafton	July 1991	0-246-13706-1	
2	Timelike Infinity	HarperCollins	December 1992	0-00-224016-5	
3	Flux	HarperCollins	December 1993	0-00-224025-4	
4	Ring	HarperCollins	July 1994	0-00-224026-2	
5	Vacuum Diagrams	HarperCollins	April 1997	0-00-225425-5	Short story collection; Philip K. Dick Award winner, 1999
—	Xeelee: An Omnibus	Gollancz	18 March 2010	978-0-575-09041-5	Collects Raft, Timeline Infinity, Flux and Ring
6	Xeelee: Endurance	Gollancz	17 September 2015	978-1-4732-1270-1	Short story collection
7	Xeelee: Vengeance	Gollancz	15 June 2017	978-1-4732-1717-1	
8	Xeelee: Redemption	Gollancz	23 August 2018	978-1-4732-1721-8	

=== Destiny's Children (2003–2006) ===
Series of thematically-linked novels set within the main Xeelee Sequence. Published by Gollancz.

No.	Title	Date	ISBN	Notes
1	Coalescent	9 October 2003	0-575-07423-X	Arthur C. Clarke Award nominee, 2004
2	Exultant	23 September 2004	0-575-07428-0	
3	Transcendent	27 October 2005	0-575-07430-2	John W. Campbell Memorial Award nominee, 2006
4	Resplendent	21 September 2006	0-575-07896-0	Short story collection

== Short fiction ==
Short fiction set within the Xeelee Sequence. Below is an incomplete list:

Title	Original publication	Issue date	Baxter collection
"The Xeelee Flower"	Interzone	Spring 1987	Vacuum Diagrams
"More Than Time or Distance"	Opus Quarterly	Winter 1988	Vacuum Diagrams
"The Eighth Room"	Dream Science Fiction	Summer 1989	Vacuum Diagrams
"The Switch"	The Edge	March/April 1990	Vacuum Diagrams
"Vacuum Diagrams"	Interzone	May 1990	Vacuum Diagrams
"The Tyranny of Heaven"	Dream Science Fiction	July 1990	Vacuum Diagrams
The Baryonic Lords, Part One	Interzone	June 1991	Vacuum Diagrams
The Baryonic Lords, Part Two	Interzone	July 1991	Vacuum Diagrams
"The Gödel Sunflowers"	Interzone	January 1992	Vacuum Diagrams
"Planck Zero"	Isaac Asimov's Science Fiction	January 1992	Vacuum Diagrams
"The Sun Person" (Note: Variant title: "The Sun-People")	Interzone	March 1993	Vacuum Diagrams
"Chiron" (Note: Revised as "Pilot" (1997).)	Novacon 23 (Note: Convention program)	November 1993	Vacuum Diagrams
"Lieserl"	Interzone	December 1993	Vacuum Diagrams
"The Logic Pool"	Asimov's Science Fiction	June 1994	Vacuum Diagrams
"Cilia-of-Gold"	Asimov's Science Fiction	August 1994	Vacuum Diagrams
"Hero"	Asimov's Science Fiction	January 1995	Vacuum Diagrams
"Gossamer"	Science Fiction Age	November 1995	Vacuum Diagrams
"Soliton Star" (Note: Revised as "Epilogue: Eve" (1997))	Asimov's Science Fiction	May 1997	Vacuum Diagrams
"Cadre Siblings"	Interzone	March 2000	Resplendent
"Silver Ghost"	Asimov's Science Fiction	September 2000	Resplendent
"On the Orion Line"	Asimov's Science Fiction	October/November 2000	Resplendent
"The Ghost Pit"	Asimov's Science Fiction	July 2001	Resplendent
"The Cold Sink"	Asimov's Science Fiction	August 2001	Resplendent
"The Dreaming Mound"	Interzone	May 2002	Resplendent
"Breeding Ground"	Asimov's Science Fiction	February 2003	Resplendent
"The Great Game"	Asimov's Science Fiction	March 2003	Resplendent
"The Chop Line"	Asimov's Science Fiction	December 2003	Resplendent
"Ghost Wars"	Asimov's Science Fiction	January 2005	Resplendent

=== Anthologies ===
Anthologized short fiction.

Title	Original collection	Editor(s)	Publisher	Date	ISBN	Baxter collection
"Blue Shift"	Writers of the Future, Vol. V	Algis Budrys	Bridge Publications	May 1989	0-88404-379-7	Vacuum Diagrams
"The Quagma Datum"	Interzone: The 4th Anthology	John Clute, et al. (Note: John Clute, Simon Ounsley and David Pringle)	Simon & Schuster	August 1989	0-671-69707-2	Vacuum Diagrams
"In the Un-Black"	Redshift Extreme	Al Sarrantonio	Roc Books	December 2001	0-451-45859-1	Resplendent
"Conurbation 2473"	Live Without a Net	Lou Anders	Roc Books	July 2003	0-451-45925-3	Resplendent
"All in a Blaze"	Stars	Janis Ian and Mike Resnick	DAW Books	5 August 2003	0-7564-0177-1	Resplendent
Between Worlds	Between Worlds	Robert Silverberg	SFBC	August 2004	1-58288-108-1	Resplendent
"Lakes of Light"	Constellations	Peter Crowther	DAW Books	4 January 2005	0-7564-0234-4	Resplendent
"Remembrance"	The New Space Opera	Gardner Dozois and Jonathan Strahan	HarperCollins	12 June 2007	978-0-06-084675-6	Endurance
The Seer and the Silverman	Galactic Empires	Gardner Dozois	SFBC	February 2008	978-1-58288-291-8	Endurance
The Return to Titan	Godlike Machines	Jonathan Strahan	SFBC	November 2010	978-1-61664-759-9	Endurance
"The Venus Generations"	Bridging Infinity (Note: The Infinity Project, Vol. 5.)	Jonathan Strahan	Games Workshop	20 October 2016	978-1-78108-418-2	—

=== Limited edition novellas ===
Limited editions distributed by UK-based PS Publishing. Mayflower II won the 2004 BSFA Award for Best Short Fiction.

Title	Date	ISBN (Note: Several ISBNs are assigned to each title.)	Baxter collection
Reality Dust	31 March 2000	1-902880-11-0	Resplendent
Riding the Rock	30 November 2002	1-902880-60-9	Resplendent
Mayflower II	1 April 2004	1-904619-17-7	Resplendent
Starfall	12 January 2009	978-1-906301-59-0	Endurance
Gravity Dreams	15 April 2011	978-1-84863-190-8	Endurance

=== Old Earth (2004–2009) ===
Short stories published as "A Tale of Old Earth". Stories are collected in Xeelee: Endurance (2015).

Title	Original publication	Issue date
"PeriAndry's Quest"	Analog Science Fiction and Fact	June 2004
"Climbing the Blue"	Analog Science Fiction and Fact	July/August 2005
"The Time Pit"	Analog Science Fiction and Fact	October 2005
"The Lowland Expedition"	Analog Science Fiction and Fact	April 2006
"Formidable Caress"	Analog Science Fiction and Fact	December 2009

== Chronology and reading order ==
The novels in chronological order (as opposed to publication order) are given below. Some of the novels contain elements occurring at different points in the timeline. The story anthologies (Vacuum Diagrams, Resplendent, and Xeelee: Endurance) each contain stories taking place across the entire chronology.

Title	Publication	Chronology (C.E.)	Notes
Coalescent	2003	476–2005	Part 1 of Destiny's Children
Transcendent	2005	2047	Part 3 of Destiny's Children; the world of Michael Poole Bazalget
Xeelee: Vengeance	2017	3646–3665	Set in an alternate timeline
Timelike Infinity	1992	3717	Majority of the plot concerns events that begin here, with later major events occurring in 3829 and the 5000s. The final chapter takes place mainly in c. 5,000,000.
Ring	1994	3951	Before Great Northern launches
Xeelee: Redemption	2018	4106 – c. 5,000,000,000	Set in the same alternate timeline as Xeelee: Vengeance
Exultant	2004	c. 24,973	Part 2 of Destiny's Children
Raft	1991	c. 104,858	
Flux	1993	c. 193,700	
Transcendent	2005	c. 500,000	Part 3 of Destiny's Children; the world of Alia
Ring	1994	c. 5,000,000	After Great Northern returns

In 2009, Baxter posted a detailed chronology of the Xeelee Sequence explaining the proper chronological reading order of all the novels, novellas, and short stories up to that year. The timeline was updated in September 2015.

When asked directly for a suggested reading order, the author wrote: "I hope that all the books and indeed the stories can be read stand-alone. I'm not a great fan of books that end with cliff-hangers. So you could go in anywhere. One way would be to start with Vacuum Diagrams, a collection that sets out the overall story of the universe. Then Timelike Infinity and Ring which tell the story of Michael Poole, then Raft and Flux which are really incidents against the wider background, and finally Destiny's Children."

== Reception ==
Science fiction author Paul J. McAuley has praised Baxter and the series, saying:

It is great, heady, mind-bending stuff, meticulously mapped onto cutting edge speculations about the birth pangs of the universe and the ultimate fate of all known time and space, constantly enlivened and driven forward by the narratives that its vast range of life generates.

== See also ==
- Stephen Baxter (author)
- Great Attractor
- Hard science fiction
