= Coalescent =

2003 novel by Stephen Baxter

- Hardcover edition cover
- Author: Stephen Baxter
- Cover artist: EkhornForss
- Language: English
- Series: Destiny's Children; Xeelee Sequence
- Genre: Science fiction novel
- Publisher: Gollancz
- Publication date: November 2003
- Publication place: United Kingdom
- Media type: Print (hardback & paperback)
- Pages: 480
- ISBN: 0-575-07423-X
- OCLC: 52695764
- Followed by: Exultant

Coalescent is a science-fiction novel by Stephen Baxter. It is part one of the Destiny's Children series. The story is set in two main time periods: modern Britain, when George Poole finds that he has a previously unknown sister and follows a trail to a mysterious and ancient organisation in Rome (Puissant Order of Holy Mary Queen of Virgins); and the time of Regina, a girl growing up during the ending of Roman rule in Britain, around AD 400.

== Plot summary ==
The book consists of four distinct parts. The primary purpose of part one is the introduction of the characters, in ancient Britain and the present. Part two introduces a modern first-person view of the Order in Rome while following Regina's budding legacy centuries before. Part three hosts the clash and resolution of Poole and the Order's realities. Part four is a look eons into Humanity's Expansion into the Universe and provides a conclusion in George Poole's present.

=== Part one ===
==== George Poole ====
George Poole copes with the mid-life crisis of losing his father. He meets Peter McLachlan, an eccentric member of an online free-thinking Internet group called the Slan(t)ers, who is researching dark matter and who is fascinated by a new and unknown artificial object discovered beyond the orbit of Pluto. George Poole uncovers an old picture showing a sister he never knew. Poole also discovers that his father regularly donated large sums of money to an organisation called the "Puissant Order of Holy Mary Queen of Virgins". Combined with a sense of futility in determining his future and encouragement from both Peter and his former wife Linda, Poole decides to uncover the mystery of his missing sister.

Poole leaves England to visit his sister Gina (who is not his newly discovered missing sister) in Florida for information, despite their strained relationship. After spoiling his clever nephews as well as clashing with his distant sister Gina, Poole extracts the contact of a Jesuit priest in Rome and his own retired uncle in Florida. Poole learns from his uncle, Lou Casella, that his twin sister was given to the ancient Order when Poole's parents were unexpectedly landed with twins.

==== Regina ====
Born into a wealthy mosaic-designing family of 5th-century Roman Britain, seven-year-old Regina is uprooted from her comfortable villa due to her father's death and the Roman Empire's withdrawal. The Roman Empire loses its strength in Britain as invading Saxons pummel the Great Wall north of Roman settlements to where Regina and her grandfather Aetius relocated. Aetius dies after losing control over his unpaid mutinous soldiers.

Regina seeks refuge with her servant Cartumandua's relatives in Verulamium but is betrayed by Carta's cousin Amator who rapes and abandons her. Verulamium burns down, forcing Regina and Cartumandua's family to live off the land in poverty for over sixteen years. Regina kills a roaming Saxon who nearly rapes her daughter, Brica. This event convinces Regina, the leader of their hamlet, to accept the invitation of warlord Artorius to help restore order to Britain again.

=== Part two ===
==== Lucia ====
In modern Rome, Lucia, a fifteen-year-old scribe for the Order, is devastated when she begins to menstruate — unlike any of her friends and colleagues within the Order. Once this is discovered Lucia is initiated into in her new role within the Order. Meanwhile, Lucia falls in love with seventeen-year-old American Daniel Stannard but is snatched back into the Order to do what is expected of her. After being impregnated by an anonymous distant cousin in a ceremony held deep within the Order's chambers Lucia gives birth following only three months of pregnancy. The baby is removed from her at once and Lucia never sees her baby again. Emotionally unstable, she runs away with Daniel.

==== Regina ====
Back in 5th Century Britain, Regina establishes her life working with Artorius, eventually managing his kingdom's record keeping. Artorius takes Regina as his wife for symbolic and moral reasons. She disdains Artorius' barbaric practices and thirst for conquest. Regina accompanies Artorius to a War Council where she realises to stay attached with the reckless Artorius would mean certain doom for her progeny. To search out her mother, Julia, Regina secures passage to Rome by allowing herself and her daughter to give sexual favours to a wealthy merchant named Ceawlin.

Upon arriving in Rome, Regina contacts Amator, now openly homosexual and a wealthy bakery owner, and demands recompense for abandoning her and her family. Regina re-establishes contact with her mother, Julia, after a cool reunion. Regina joins the Puissant Order of Holy Mary Queen of Virgins, a Christian-adapted faction of the Vestal Virgins located on the Appian Way – an organisation that her family has become intimate with. Regina's leadership revives the ageing Order by converting it into a successful private school. Years later, on the night following her daughter's marriage, the Sack of Rome in 455 by the Vandals occurs. Regina's foresight saves the Order when the women and children are evacuated into the catacombs she had dug for a sanctuary.

In Regina's twilight years, she establishes important rules precedents for the Order. Unnecessary and unsupportable births are prohibited. A handful of mothers must dedicate their lives to replenishing the Order with births. Before her death in 476 AD, Regina establishes three main rules to govern the Order:

- Sisters matter more than daughters.
- Ignorance is strength.
- Listen to your sisters.

=== Part three ===
In the centuries following Regina's death, the Order assists the poor, robbed, and injured, gaining donations to its coffers from the occasional assisted person who became wealthy. Another Crypt that developed similarly to the Order is found and plans made for its eradication and occupation. In 1527, the Order survives the pillage of Rome during the Papacy of Clement VII by sacrificing five of its members to rape and death to divert Clement and his men's attention from an entrance to the Crypt.

==== George Poole ====
Meanwhile, in the present, George Poole, followed by a nervous Peter McLachlan, has a cool reunion with his lost sister Rosa. Rosa gives George a tour of the Crypt, the Order's secret human cache. Peter speculates with George about evidence of intelligent dark matter life moving through earth. Daniel serendipitously meets with George Poole, who is searching for additional information about the Order. Daniel, George Poole, and Peter take the very pregnant Lucia to a hospital where Peter becomes suspicious of the mysterious Order. The Order promptly retrieves Lucia from the hospital but not before Peter and George learn that most of the Crypt's inhabitants remain prepubescent indefinitely.

George Poole convinces his Jesuit priest contact to grant Peter access to ancient Catholic records. George's patriarchal roots are traced to a British surveyor named George Poole who came to Rome in 1863. George returns to the Crypt looking for information and finds himself smothered with the familiar smell and contact of those in the Crypt, all of whom share his similar facial features (namely, cloudy grey eyes). His sister Rosa almost persuades him to become assimilated into the Order as a stud but an urgent text message by Peter brings him to his senses.

Peter has a theory explaining the strange peculiarities of the Order. The Order is a family of eusocial humans that evolved from the intense pressures to survive the various conquests of Rome over the centuries. He cites naked mole rats as an example of eusocial behaviour in mammals. He explains how Regina's three rules result in a "genetic mandate for eusociality." He calls the Order a "human hive" and labels them "Coalescents" — a new kind of human. Peter then suddenly leaves after receiving a text message.

Days later, George learns that Peter has invaded the Crypt and is threatening to set off Semtex plastic explosives to expose the Order. Peter and the Slan(t)ers are responsible for the recent bombing of a San Jose research facility investigating quantum gravity technology – under the belief that a higher intelligence would notice the manipulation of space-time and eradicate a possible threat to their superiority. Peter's reasoning in exposing the Crypt is that the Order does not exist for any purpose except for itself. It threatens to destroy humanity as individuals and replace it with mindless drones. Peter Mclachlan then detonates his bombs and dies. George begins the evacuation of the Crypt, and the mob of drones emerge hive-like from the crater in the middle of Via Cristoforo Colombo.

=== Part four ===
Toward the end of the novel there are also two short sections telling of a hive planet in the far future. A planet has been knocked out of its solar orbit, and the hives have survived deep underground for aeons. A military mission arrives, aiming to secure workers for the war-effort, and invades a colony. They fight their way into the hive, and ship the survivors off-world.

== Recognition ==
Coalescent was nominated for the Arthur C. Clarke Award in 2004.

== Reception ==
Publishers Weekly reviewed the novel stating that "Baxter provokes thought by plausibly creating specific circumstances that result in evolution." While Kirkus pointed out that the author might not win awards for his literary style however, "he's much more convincing when he writes about physical science and engineering."
