= Exultant (novel) =

2004 novel by Stephen Baxter

- First edition
- Author: Stephen Baxter
- Cover artist: EkhornForss
- Language: English
- Series: Destiny's Children; Xeelee Sequence
- Genre: Science fiction novel
- Publisher: Gollancz
- Publication date: September 2004
- Publication place: United Kingdom
- Media type: Print (hardback & paperback)
- Pages: 490
- ISBN: 0-575-07428-0
- OCLC: 56439330
- Preceded by: Coalescent
- Followed by: Transcendent

Exultant is a science fiction novel by British author Stephen Baxter. It is part two of the Destiny's Children series. The book was published by Victor Gollancz Ltd in September 2004.

== Overview ==
Much of the book is written as large sections of prose explaining theoretical exotic-matter physics. Baxter also sketches the evolution of the Xeelee and an imaginary history of the universe in which life is ubiquitous even under the most extreme conditions.

== Plot summary ==
Exultant is set in Baxter's "Xeelee Sequence" twenty thousand years into the Third Expansion of Mankind, "a titanic project undertaken by a mankind united by the Doctrines forged by Hama Druz after mankind's near extinction." The human-supremacist Interim Coalition of Governance has conquered almost the whole Milky Way — all but the alien Xeelee concentrated at the galactic core around a supermassive black hole called Chandra. The mysterious Xeelee are far more advanced but less numerous than the humans, and the war has been at a stalemate for three millennia even though the entire Coalition has been directed toward the war effort and ten billion humans die at the front every year. In a war fought with faster-than-light technology (equivalent to time travel), each side has foreknowledge of the other's actions and can develop counter-measures to plans before they are made.

Pirius is a fighter pilot stationed at the front. When a battle turns to disaster for the Coalition forces, he disobeys suicide orders to stand and fight, choosing instead to risk survival. In a desperate gamble to outrun a pursuing Xeelee, Pirius captures a Xeelee fighter for the first time in history. Returning to base via FTL travel, he arrives two years previous to the battle, when his younger self is still a cadet. Rather than being lauded as a hero, both instances of Pirius are court-martialed for disobeying orders.

Commissary Nilis of the Office of Technological Archival and Control, part of the Commission for Historical Truth, defends both the older Pirius (whom he calls "Pirius Blue") and the younger one ("Pirius Red") but loses the trial. Pirius Blue is sent to a penal unit at the front as a foot soldier, and Pirius Red is remanded to the custody of Commissary Nilis, who has plans for the fruits of Pirius Blue's battlefield victory. Using the Xeelee fighter and the innovative tactics that saved Pirius Blue, he starts to plan an unheard of assault on the Xeelee's primary stronghold at Chandra itself.

While Nilis and his new team struggle to confront ossified government and military institutions, they try to understand and to develop new and sometimes alien technologies: FTL computers, a gravastar shield to protect them from FTL foreknowledge, and a black hole gun, capable of disrupting a supermassive black hole's event horizon. Meanwhile, in the course of his new duties to Commissary Nilis, Pirius Red is practically taken on a tour of the Solar System and some of the Coalition's most scandalous secrets, rife with references to events from previous books in the Xeelee sequence.

As Nilis's project nears completion, it transpires that the Chandra black hole is home to not only the Xeelee, but a host of other organisms, many of which are based on exotic physics and non-baryonic matter. Regardless, the assault on the black hole continues despite protestations from Nilis. After a brutal fight to reach the surface of the black hole, the team commences their assault, causing the Xeelee to abandon it (and the rest of the Milky Way galaxy) to prevent humanity from harming the black hole's inhabitants.

After the assault, the protagonists realise that the Coalition is unlikely to remain intact, now that the war with the Xeelee is no longer present to hold it together. Luru Parz, one of the team, realises that the Xeelee will eventually return, and returns to Earth to ready its defences for when the return happens.
