= The Massacre of Mankind =

2017 science fiction novel by Stephen Baxter

- First edition cover
- Author: Stephen Baxter
- Language: English
- Genre: Science fiction
- Publisher: Orion Books
- Publication date: 19 January 2017
- Media type: Print (hardback & paperback)
- Pages: 453
- ISBN: 978-1-4732-0509-3
- Preceded by: The War of the Worlds

The Massacre of Mankind is a 2017 science fiction novel by the British writer Stephen Baxter, a sequel to H. G. Wells' 1898 classic The War of the Worlds, authorised by the Wells estate. It is set in 1921, 14 years after the Martian invasion in the original novel which was set circa 1907, as a second Martian invasion is chronicled by Miss Julie Elphinstone, the ex-sister-in-law of the narrator of War of the Worlds. Baxter also wrote an authorised sequel to Wells' novel The Time Machine, called The Time Ships.

== Plot summary ==
From New York City in 1921, four people sail to England to meet with Walter Jenkins, the original author of the War of the Worlds story. Jenkins has seen signs that the Martians may be planning a second attack. They arrive to find London has become a totalitarian dystopia and the whole country is gearing up for war. Walter's brother, Frank, is conscripted the next day and London prepares for war. Beginning at 7:00pm, 50 cylinder-shaped Martian missiles land on the city, wiping out nearly half of the British Armed Forces. At midnight, another group of cylinders lands, carrying Martian warriors. The Martians emerge immediately, in contrast to the 19 hours required in their 1907 landings, and engage the British military with their heat rays. Counterattacks by the Army, the Navy and the relatively new Air Force prove mostly harmless against the Martian fighting-machines. Over the next few days, the Martians cripple London, carefully selecting targets of infrastructural importance, such as bridges, factories and railway stations. Many Londoners escape or take shelter.

Two years later in 1923, the Martians control England, though they mostly remain within their cordon. Jenkins asks Julie Elphinstone, his former sister-in-law, to go into the Martian cordon to try to communicate with them. She and her group make the long journey to there, dodging several Martian attacks along the way and meeting a saboteur named Marriott. At the Martian base, they discover that the Martians are carnivorous, keeping humans and humanoid species in holding tanks for future harvesting. They witness breeding experiments between Martians and humans. Eventually, they come to the feeding hole, where the Martians have humans hung upside-down from scaffolding while they inject the human's blood directly into their Martian bodies.

As the Martians continue to conquer other parts of Earth, Julie comes up with a plan. Knowing that the Martians communicate with their home planet by using sigils carved into the earth's surface, she wonders whether it would be possible to change the sigils and therefore disrupt communications. Eric Eden, a veteran of the first Martian war, agrees to let her attempt it. Eden transports Julie inside the cordon with his "landship", a massive tank-like vehicle the size of a battleship. Julie contacts the saboteur Marriott, who agrees to detonate numerous explosives to change the Martian sigils into the circular Jovian symbols. Within two hours, the Martians have withdrawn and the Jovians leave their circular sigil on the moon.

The book jumps forward 14 years to 1937. The Martians are still on Earth but no one knows where. Jenkins takes Julie half a mile into the earth to the underground Martian city in England. He speculates that this is how they live on Mars, that they have no secrets because of their telepathy, and that they are all treated as equals. The British Martians built a space gun and fired themselves back to Mars.

Reports say that other Martians moved to the Earth's poles where the climate is more Mars-like. Julie, Jenkins, Eden and some others take a massive German Zeppelin to the Arctic, where they see a Martian terraforming operation. Jenkins theorizes that, with the Jovians watching, they are forced to colonize rather than conquer, and that humans should work with them instead of against.

When Earth-Mars opposition comes around again, the Martians do not launch any cylinders. The war of the worlds is over.

In addition to the main storyline, the novel contains various standalone vignettes depicting Martian attacks in New York City, Berlin and Los Angeles.
