= Timelike Infinity =

1993 novel by Stephen Baxter

- First edition cover
- Author: Stephen Baxter
- Cover artist: Chris Moore
- Language: English
- Series: Xeelee Sequence
- Genre: Science fiction
- Publisher: HarperCollins (UK)
- Publication date: 7 December 1992
- Publication place: United Kingdom
- Media type: Print
- Pages: 253
- ISBN: 0-00-224016-5
- OCLC: 27959074
- Preceded by: Raft
- Followed by: Flux

Timelike Infinity is a 1992 science fiction book by British author Stephen Baxter. The second book in the Xeelee Sequence, Timelike Infinity introduces a universe of powerful alien species and technologies that manages to maintain a realistic edge because of Baxter's physics background. It largely sets the stage for the magnum opus of the Xeelee Sequence, Ring (as opposed to Vacuum Diagrams, Flux, or Raft, which concern themselves with side stories).

== Plot summary ==
Set thousands of years in the future (AD 5407), the human race has been conquered by the Qax, a truly alien turbulent-liquid form of life, who now rule over the few star systems of human space – adopting processes from human history to effectively oppress the resentful race. Humans have encountered a few other races, including the astoundingly advanced Xeelee, and been conquered once before – by the Squeem – but successfully recovered.

A human-built device, the Interface project, returns to the Solar System after 1,500 years. The project, towed by the spaceship Cauchy, returns a wormhole gate, appearing to offer time travel due to the time 'difference' between the exits of the wormhole (relativistic time dilation), with one end having remained in the Solar System and the other travelling at near lightspeed for a century. The Qax had destroyed the Solar System gate, but a lashed-up human ship (a great chunk of soil including Stonehenge, crewed by a group called the Friends of Wigner) passes through the returning gate, travelling back to the unconquered humanity of 1,500 years ago.

One of the crew of the Cauchy returns with the Friends, Miriam Berg. The Friends have a complex scheme, which does not include a simple military return-and-rescue – the 1,500-year technology gap makes this "risible". From the Wigner thought experiment they have postulated an unusual theory on the ultimate destiny of life in the universe. They believe that quantum wave-functions do not collapse like the Copenhagen interpretation holds, nor that each collapse actually buds off separate universes (like the quantum multiverse hypothesis holds) but rather that the universe is a participatory universe: the entire universe exists as a single massive quantum superposition, and that at the end of time (in the open universe of the Xeelee Sequence, time and space are unbounded, or more precisely, bounded only at the Cauchy boundaries of "Time-like infinity" and "Space-like infinity"), when intelligent life collects all information (compare the final anthropic principle and the Omega Point), it will transform into an "Ultimate Observer" and make the "final Observation", the observation which collapses all the possible entangled wave-functions generated since the beginning of the universe. They believe further that the Ultimate Observer will not merely observe, but choose which world line will be the true world-line, and that it will choose the one in which humanity suffers no Squeem or Qax occupations. However, the Ultimate Observer cannot choose between worldlines if no information survives to its era to distinguish worldlines- if the UO never knows of humanity, it cannot choose a worldline favourable to it. In other words, some way is needed to securely send information forward in time.

As a consequence of this necessity, they intend to turn Jupiter into a carefully formed singularity and use the precisely specified parameters as a method of encoding information. Miriam Berg is more concerned over the immediate fate of humanity, with the threat of the future Qax, and transmits a 'help' message to the gate designer Michael Poole.

The Qax, naturally, panic a little at the escape to the past. A complex, unavoidably fragile species in their huge living Spline spacecraft, the few Qax present are somewhat at a loss. They decide to build their own Interface, with major human-collaborator assistance (headed by Ambassador Jasoft Parz), to create a link to their future to gain aid in resolving the problem – with more modern GUT-engine spacecraft they can make a 500-year link in just eighteen months. A startling high-technology future vessel (in truth, one of the legendary Xeelee nightfighters, an advanced and long-range fast scout ship), with a future Qax comes through the gate. Its first act is to execute the Qax Governor of Earth and gather up Parz, before passing through the original portal after the Friends and all humanity. The future Qax takes two Spline ships (presumably leaving behind the nightfighter; this might be the nightfighter that is discovered by the crew of The Great Northern millennia later in Ring) through the gate and on the journey reveals to Parz the reason behind its desire to completely destroy the human race.

=== The Ring ===
The future Qax tells Parz that over the centuries, the Qax had worn down humanity through constant oppression, and had eventually decided to eliminate its space-faring capabilities. But before they did, as economical traders, they wished to get as much value out of their human pilots as possible. So certain pilots were dispatched on a number of dangerous or quixotic missions.

One such pilot was a man named Jim Bolder. The Qax had come into possession of a Xeelee nightfighter, and had modified it to support human control. Bolder's mission was simple: go to the Great Attractor, the cause of most galactic drift, and find out why and how it exists. Bolder travelled to the bottom of the gravitational well, and found the Ring. A torus a thousand light-years in diameter, constructed of an unknown substance, rotating at a large fraction of lightspeed. The Qax goes on to speculate that the torus created a Kerr metric, and that it allowed egress from the current universe, that it was in effect an escape route for the Xeelee. Before Parz, the Spline warship, and the Qax exit the wormhole, the Qax asks, "What do Xeelee fear, do you suppose?". Regardless, Bolder escaped the Great Attractor and returned to the Qax home system, where he was supposed to be taken into custody by dozens of Spline warships wielding gravitational-wave based "starbreakers" and his priceless data on the god-like Xeelee's ultimate project secured. Bolder either did not, or somehow escaped; in the ensuing fight, the starbreakers were accidentally fired at the Qax system primary star, and true to their name, destabilised it, causing it to go nova. The Qax were forced to hurriedly evacuate. Many died, and the power of the Qax trading empire (and by extension, their Occupation of Earth) ended.

=== Defeat ===
In the past, Poole joins Berg on the Friend vessel shortly before the Qax emerges, having travelled aboard his ship, Hermit Crab, from the Oort cloud. He is accompanied by a Virtual of his father, Harry. Together they elude the control of the Friends, whose project fails under the bombardment of the Spline's starbreaker beam. Miriam Berg commandeers the singularity cannon used to sculpt Jupiter and fires a pair of black holes into the Spline, which merge and disable it. Meanwhile, aided by Jasoft Parz's internal sabotage, Poole succeeds in ramming the Hermit Crab into the second Spline, killing the sapience of the vessel and the entangled Qax, second Governor of Earth, with it. Harry takes over in lieu of the higher intelligence and, at the direction of Poole, steers it back into the wormhole: when inside, Poole intends to activate the hyperdrive, shattering the fragile dimensional warping of the wormhole, and of all wormholes connecting to it, thus saving humanity from further interference by the future.

Poole's audacious plan succeeds, but with an unexpected side effect. As the hyperdrive activates, it somewhat shatters space-time, forming a long series of interconnected wormholes that hurl Poole 5 million years forward into the far future. Poole discovers a sad cosmos, in which the stars are guttering out; the Friends were wrong- intelligent life would not triumph and remake the cosmos, eventually leading to their Prime Observer.

His ship shattered and broken, Poole begins dying, but at the last moment, an "anti-Xeelee" (whom it is implied is a being created by the Xeelee to be like them, except travelling like a tachyon backwards in time, the better to mould the Xeelee's early evolutionary history) takes a liking to Poole, and converts him into an intangible immortal being of "quantum functions". In this form, Poole travels the universe, but out of boredom, eventually begins to lapse into a quasi-coma- until an unexpected event occurs: a savage in a glass box, having travelled through a wormhole like Poole himself. "History resumed." (This final event is one of the early plot points of the Ring.)

== Reception ==
Timelike Infinity is listed in Damien Broderick's and Paul Di Filippo's book Science Fiction: The 101 Best Novels 1985–2010.

== Versions in other languages ==
- 1994, Das Geflecht der Unendlichkeit (German)
- 1995, 時間的無限大 (Japanese)
- 1997, Grenzen in het oneindige (Dutch)
- 1998, Infinito (Italian)
- 1999, Czasopodobna nieskończoność (Polish)
- 2010, Singularité (French)
