= The H-Bomb Girl =

2007 novel by Stephen Baxter

- First edition with quote from Paul Cornell
- Author: Stephen Baxter
- Cover artist: James Taylor (illustration); Mandy Norman (design)
- Language: English
- Genre: Science fiction
- Publisher: Faber and Faber
- Publication date: 2007
- Publication place: United Kingdom
- Media type: Print (Paperback)
- Pages: 265
- ISBN: 0-571-23279-5

The H-Bomb Girl is a science fiction novel by Stephen Baxter.

== Plot introduction ==
Set in October 1962, in Liverpool, actually in and around the author's own school, with the Cuban Missile Crisis looming, it concerns 14-year-old Laura Mann, who has been entrusted with a strange key and code number to memorize by her father, an RAF officer at Strike Command in High Wycombe. The key turns out to be for a nuclear armed Vulcan bomber and it becomes the target of time travellers from 2007, from alternate versions of Laura's own future, all seeking to change the course of history.

The vibrant popular culture of 1960s Liverpool features prominently in the novel, the climax takes place during a Beatles concert at The Cavern Club with Cilla Black as cloakroom attendant.

== Literary significance and reception ==
The SF Site reviewed the novel favorably, commenting that Baxter's novel was realistic and mostly avoided the clichés associated with stories of time travel, dystopias and the apocalypse.

Adam Roberts praised Baxter's handling of the young adult medium, calling it "a gripping, informative, extremely likeable little novel".

The novel was shortlisted for the 2008 Arthur C. Clarke Award.
