= Destiny's Children =

Science fiction series by Stephen Baxter

Destiny's Children is a science-fiction series by Stephen Baxter. It takes place within his larger series, the Xeelee Sequence. Like his previous Manifold Trilogy, the books are not direct sequels to one another, but are instead thematically linked by the appearance of concepts, themes, and sometimes characters in multiple books. Examples of this include:

- A coalescence is visited in all three novels.
- The Kuiper Anomaly, a tetrahedral artifact that appears in the Kuiper belt, is discovered in Coalescent, mentioned briefly in Exultant, and finally explained in Transcendent.
- The characters George Poole, Michael Poole, and Rosa Poole appear in both Coalescent and Transcendent.
- Each book deals in some way with the future evolution of humans, both physically and sociologically. For example, Coalescent discusses the ability of humans living with limited space and resources to evolve a society that resembles insect hives. Transcendent deals with several post-human forms that are found to have evolved to adapt planets that they colonized. The theme is present in Exultant insofar as the novel deals with humanity as evolved to fight a war that has lasted tens of thousands of years.
- Each book further deals in some way with the existence and identity of God. For example, Exultant suggests that there was consciousness present before the universe began that selected this universe for its ability to sustain life. Transcendent discusses a group of humans that have transcended to a higher consciousness as becoming a god, and uses established theology to attempt to dissect the Transcendent's motives.

Books in the series:

- Coalescent (2003) - Arthur C. Clarke Award nominee, 2004
- Exultant (2004)
- Transcendent (2005) - John W. Campbell Memorial award nominee, 2006
- Resplendent (2006)
