= The Mammoth Trilogy =

Series of novels by Stephen Baxter

The Mammoth Trilogy is a series of books by hard science fiction author Stephen Baxter. The books in it were published between 1999 and 2001. It contains the novels Silverhair, Longtusk and Icebones.

An omnibus volume containing all three novels was released in 2004, with the title Behemoth.

== Silverhair ==
Silverhair, the first book, was published in 1999. This story is about Silverhair, a female mammoth. On an isolated Russian island near the Arctic Circle, a clan of intelligent mammoths have survived the ice age and into the modern day, though their numbers are dwindling as the climate warms. A group of humans come ashore and start hunting the mammoths. The herd tries to escape and then it fights back. The mammoths are depicted as having near-human intelligence and an oral culture that goes back millions of years.

== Longtusk ==
Longtusk is the second book, published in 1999. Set in the far past, when the glaciers are retreating, Longtusk tells the story of the mammoths' early encounters with humanity.

== Icebones ==
Cover of the first edition, published Gollancz. Art by Peter Barrett.

Icebones is the third book, published in 2001. The novel is set in 3000 AD. After colonizing Mars some time ago and planning to populate the terraformed planet with ancient animals from Earth, humans had disappeared. One of the animals now left to fend for themselves is Icebones, daughter of Silverhair, who as the only adult mammoth taken to Mars also has responsibility for the herd.

== Reception ==
Kirkus Reviews said in their review that it is "impossible not to cheer for Baxter's plucky pachyderms: a saga that, even at its most improbable, engages the reader's heart and mind." Jackie Cassada, in her review for Library Journal, wrote, "Baxter brings the great creatures of Earth's prehistory to life."
