= Stone Spring =

2010 novel by Stephen Baxter

- First edition
- Author: Stephen Baxter
- Language: English
- Genre: Science fiction
- Publisher: Gollancz
- Publication date: 3 June 2010
- Publication place: United Kingdom
- Media type: Print (hardback & paperback)
- Pages: 496 (Hardcover)
- ISBN: 978-0-575-08919-8
- Followed by: Bronze Summer

Stone Spring is a 2010 science fiction novel by British writer Stephen Baxter. It is set in prehistoric Doggerland (renamed "Northland" in the novel) and focuses on the attempts of Northland's inhabitants to adapt to the rising sea levels slowly eroding Northland's coastline. It is the first part of a trilogy detailing an alternate history in which human efforts were able to prevent Doggerland from being flooded.

== Plot summary ==
The focus of much of the novel is the community of Etxelur. Etxelur begins as a typical stone-age civilisation, remarkable only for its flint, which is prized throughout most of Northland. It is nominally ruled by a figure known as the "Giver", but as Kirike, the current Giver, is missing, leadership falls to Zesi, his eldest daughter. Every year, Etxelur and its neighbours, the brutish "Pretani" (located in modern-day England), hold a ceremony known as the Giving on Etxelur soil. Representing the Pretani leader are brothers Gall and Shade, who share the house with Zesi and her 14-year-old sister Ana. Gall, the eldest brother, has been promised Zesi as a bride by his father, but Zesi instead sleeps with the younger brother Shade, enraging Gall. To make matters worse, Gall kills a member of the neighbouring "Snailhead" tribe during a communal hunt.

Tensions come to a head during the giving, whereupon the Pretani leader (or "Root") arrives and demands that Shade and Gall resolve their dispute by a fight to the death, in which Gall is killed. Kirike also returns to Etxelur, along with outsiders Ice Dreamer (rescued from North America by Kirike during his travels) and Novu (a slave who killed his master and escaped, with a particular skill for making bricks). Kirike resumes leadership of Etxelur, much to Zesi's resentment. Zesi ultimately decides to leave with the Pretani to challenge them in a hunting contest on their own territory.

Meanwhile, back in Etxelur, rising sea levels result in a tsunami, known to the locals as the "Great Sea". Most of Etxelur is destroyed, and many of its inhabitants are wiped out, including Kirike. With Zesi absent, Ana becomes the de facto leader of Etxelur. During the tsunami, Ana witnessed seabed formations resembling Etxelur's religious symbols, and, believing them to hold spiritual significance, ultimately resolves to build a dyke to hold back the sea and enable the formations to be reached once again. Novu, who has the most experience, obsessively oversees the construction of the dyke, and Ana adopts increasingly Draconian measures to ensure construction continues.

When Zesi returns to Etxelur, she violently opposes Ana's work. She breaks one of the giant pools which holds water that is meant to flow back into the sea and kills a Snailhead child. This ultimately results in her being exiled and her child taken from her. Vowing revenge on Ana, Zesi ultimately returns to Pretani territory, where she convinces Shade (now the Root of the Pretani) to help her destroy Etxelur. Together, they plan to offer slave labour to Etxelur, with the intention of organising a slave uprising and then attacking Etxelur in the chaos. Before this can be done, however, Ana uncovers the plan and frees the slaves herself. The Pretani attack is beaten back, and Zesi is killed during the fight.

The novel ends some years later, where construction of the dykes is finally complete, and the undersea formations Ana sought to uncover have finally been reached.
