= Reproductive suppression =

Inhibition of reproduction in otherwise healthy adults

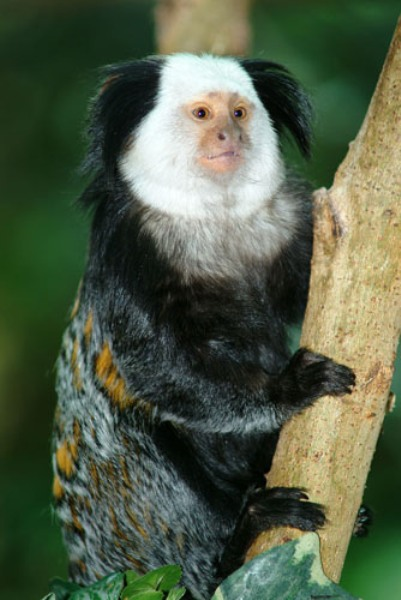
Reproduction of subordinate marmosets is suppressed by the withholding of infant care.

Reproductive suppression is the prevention or inhibition of reproduction in otherwise healthy adult individuals. It occurs in birds, mammals, and social insects. It is sometimes accompanied by cooperative breeding. It is maintained by behavioral mechanisms such as aggression, and physiological mechanisms such as pheromone signalling. In evolutionary terms, it may be explained by the theory of inclusive fitness.

== Overview ==
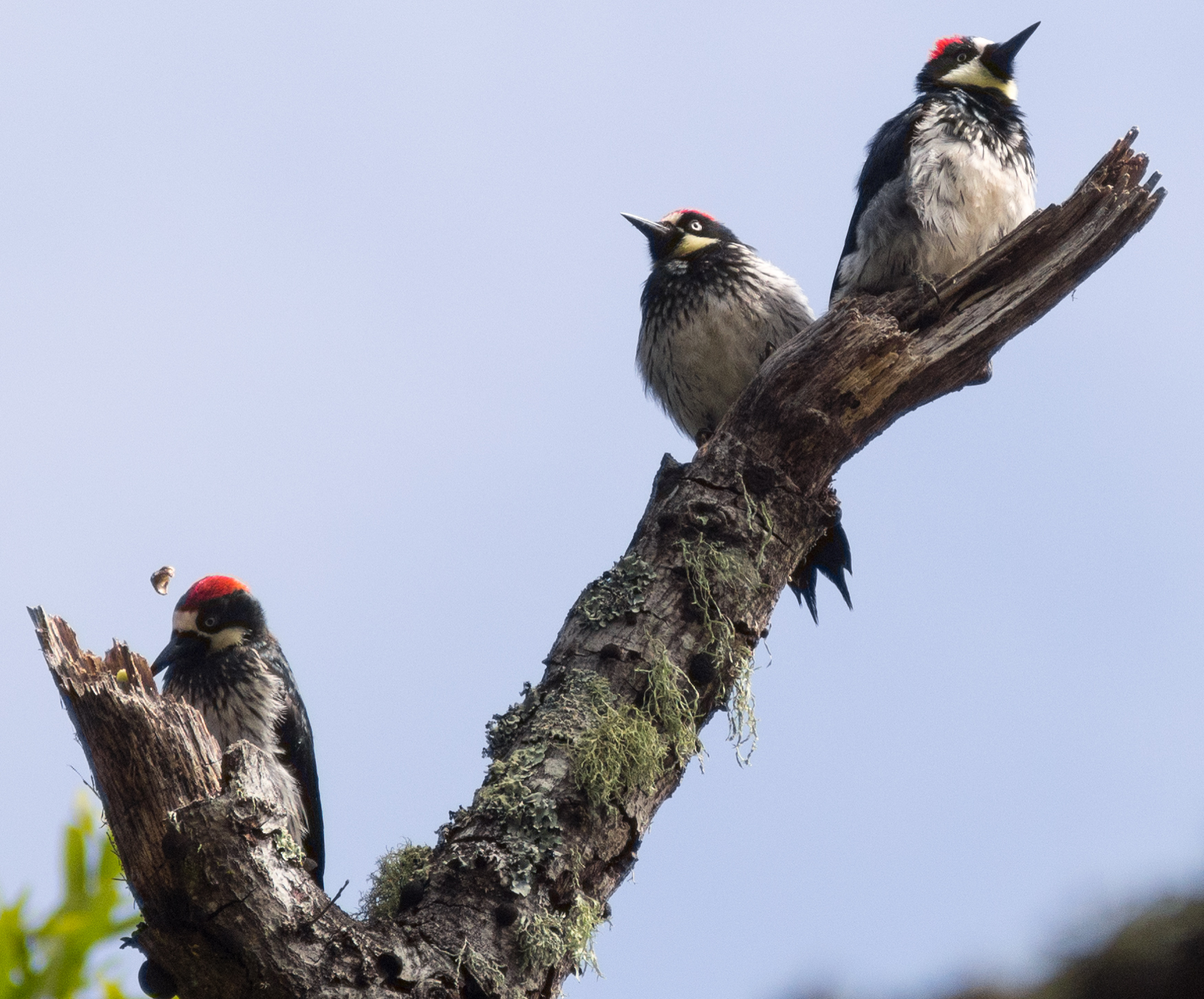
Acorn woodpeckers are among the birds that breed cooperatively and make use of reproductive suppression.

Reproductive suppression is the prevention or inhibition of reproduction in otherwise healthy adult individuals. It includes delayed sexual maturation (puberty) or inhibition of sexual receptivity, facultatively increased interbirth interval through delayed or inhibited ovulation or spontaneous or induced abortion, abandonment of immature and dependent offspring, mate guarding, selective destruction and worker policing of eggs in some eusocial insects or cooperatively breeding birds, and infanticide of the offspring of subordinate females either by directly killing by dominant females or males in mammals or indirectly through the withholding of assistance with infant care in marmosets and some carnivores.

The reproductive suppression model holds that "females can optimize their lifetime reproductive success by suppressing reproduction when future (physical or social) conditions for the survival of offspring are likely to be greatly improved over present ones”. When intragroup competition is high it may be beneficial to suppress the reproduction of others, and for subordinate females to suppress their own reproduction until a later time when social competition is reduced. This leads to reproductive skew within a social group, with some individuals having more offspring than others. The cost of reproductive suppression to the individual is lowest at the earliest stages of a reproductive event and reproductive suppression is often easiest to induce at the pre-ovulatory or earliest stages of pregnancy in mammals, and greatest after a birth. Therefore, neuroendocrine cues for assessing reproductive success should evolve to be reliable at early stages in the ovulatory cycle.

Reproductive suppression occurs in its most extreme form in eusocial insects such as termites, paper wasps and honeybees, and in a mammal, the naked mole rat, which depend on a complex division of labor within the group for survival and in which specific genes, epigenetics and other factors determine whether individuals will permanently be unable to breed or able to reach reproductive maturity under particular social conditions.

It is found, too, among cooperatively breeding fish; cooperatively breeding birds such as some woodpeckers; and mammals in which a breeding pair depends on helpers whose reproduction is suppressed.

In eusocial and cooperatively breeding animals, most non-reproducing helpers engage in kin selection, enhancing their own inclusive fitness by ensuring the survival of offspring they are closely related to. Wolf packs suppress subordinate breeding.

== Pre-fertilization ==
=== Environmental cues ===
==== Food shortage ====
Female mammals experience delays in the onset of puberty or increase their interbirth intervals in response to environmental conditions that are associated with low abundance and poor quality of foods. Nutritional stress is apparently linked to the female endocrine system and ovulatory pheromonal cycle. For example, Orangutans (Pongo pygmaeus) experience high ketone (due to fat burning) and low estrogen levels during times of low food availability and poor food quality, but low ketone and high estrogen levels that stimulates onset of the ovulation during the fruit masting seasons that occurs about every four years on Sumatra. Since adult female orangutans are solitary, interference by other females can be ruled out as influencing their temporary reproductive suppression and facultatively long interbirth intervals. Polygynandrous yellow baboons (Papio cynocephalus) in Kenya were far less likely to ovulate or conceive during periods of drought or extreme heat, especially if they live in large groups, resulting in longer interbirth intervals during periods of nutritional and thermal stress.

==== Population density ====
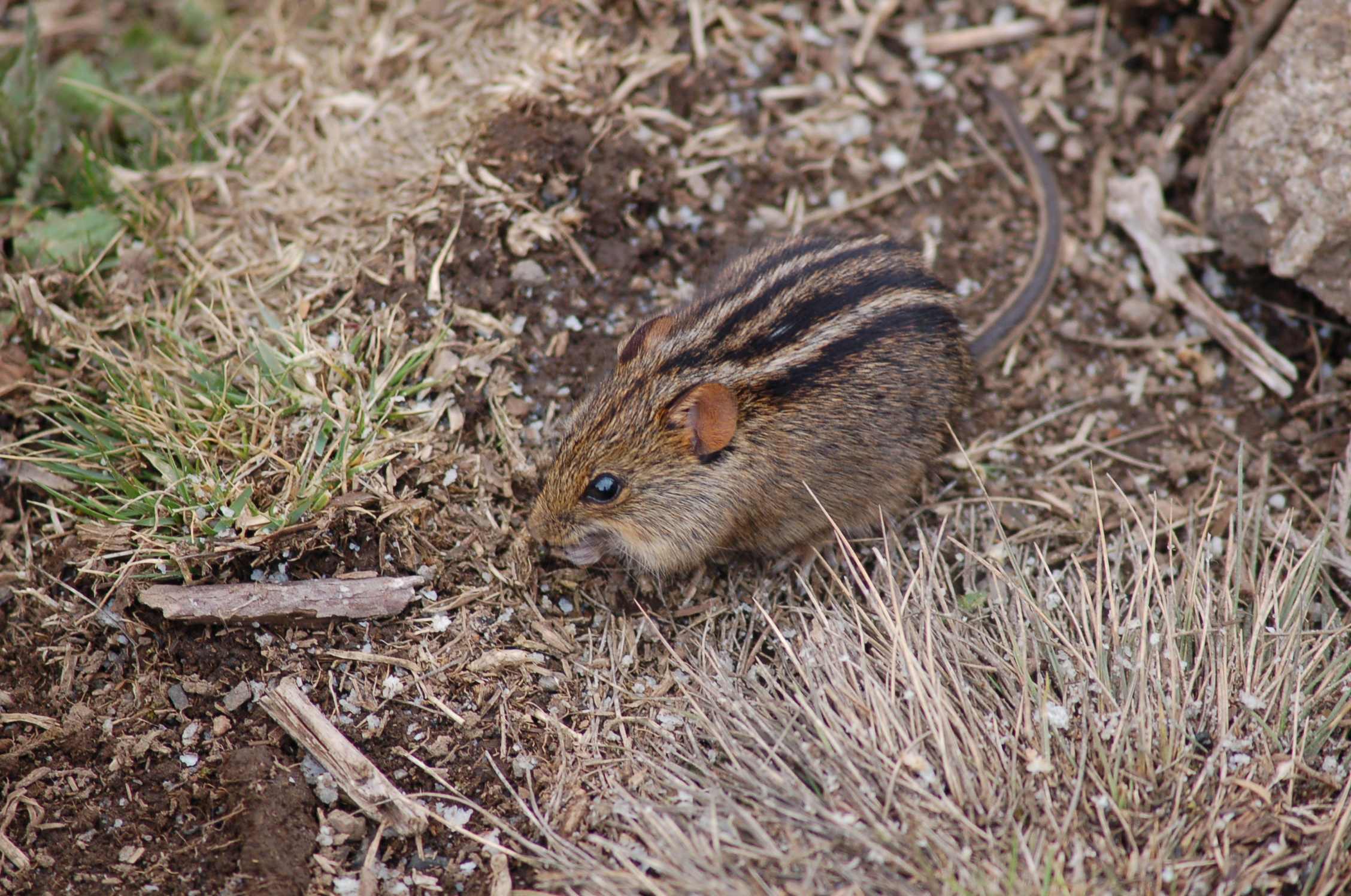
Striped mice have reproductive suppression when in communally breeding groups but not when in monogamous social groups.

High population density can lead to reproductive suppression. For example, when high numbers of yellow baboon (Papio cynocephalus) females are simultaneously in estrous at Mikumi National Park, Tanzania, dominant females form coalitions that attack subordinate females, disrupting their reproductive cycle and preventing conception. This places constraints on the number of offspring born in a single generation. Since infant mortality in these baboons depends in part on the number and ages of other infants born into the group, pre-ovulatory females that are most susceptible to stress-induced delay or inhibition of ovulation are the most frequent targets of female coalition attacks. Female attackers are often in advanced stages of pregnancy and have the most to lose if the number of infants in the group reaches an unsustainable level. A similar study of Chacma baboons (Papio ursinus) noted high levels of female-female aggression around the mating season when the number of ovulating females was high (indicated by sexual swellings) and that aggression directed toward suppressing the mating opportunities of ovulating females.

Among elephant seals (Mirounga), high neonatal mortality occurs when the number of pups born in a season is high, with deaths resulting from injury and starvation. To counteract loss of their pups elephant seals conceive next year's offspring immediately after giving birth to this year's young, but delay implantation for 4 months. Female striped mice (Rhabdomys pumilio) in monogamous social groups do not experience reproductive suppression, but those living in communally breeding groups with high population density and large numbers of old breeding females do.

=== Social cues ===
==== Aggression ====
Chronic physiological stress resulting from aggression by dominant toward subordinate individuals is thought to be a major cause of delayed maturation and suppressed ovulation in subordinate individuals of a wide range of species. In response to stress the HPA axis (hypothalamic-pituitary-adrenocortical axis) is activated, producing high concentrations of circulating adrenal glucocorticoids which, when chronically present, negatively influence an animal's health and can lead to reproductive suppression in male marmots (Marmota marmota), and blocks of ovulatory cycles of female talapoin monkeys (Miopithecus talapoin), meerkats (Suricata suricatta) and marmots.

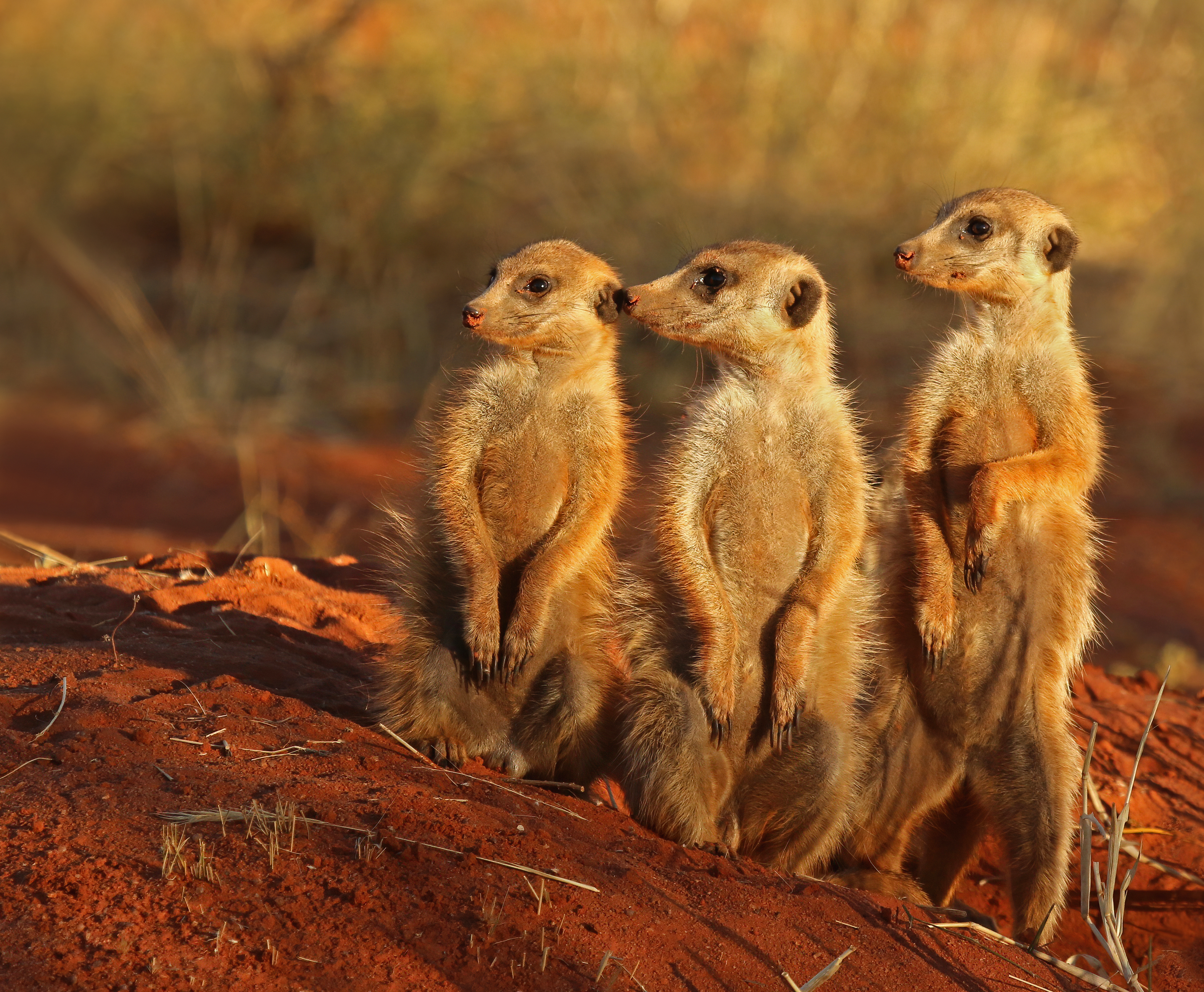
Meerkats (Suricata suricatta) breed cooperatively, and the dominant female aggressively suppresses breeding in subordinate females.

In cooperatively breeding meerkats (Suricata suricatta) the dominant breeding female is the oldest and heaviest female who is highly aggressive toward subordinate females during the breeding season and temporarily evicts subordinate females from the group. Evicted subordinates suffer repeated attacks during the later stages of the breeding female's pregnancy and showed glucocorticoid levels twice normal. Approximately 3 days after giving birth, subordinate females return to the group to help rear the breeding female's pups, at which time the dominant female is no longer aggressive toward them. By inducing the stress response in subordinates, the breeding female disrupts the ovulatory cycle and prevents mating of the subordinate females, or causes the pregnancies of subordinates to fail if they do occur. If her social group is small the breeding female evicts all subordinate females, but if it is large she targets older females, pregnant females and non-kin.

However, reproductive suppression through stress does not apply to many species including orangutans for which subordinate males have lower GC levels than dominant ones, marmosets for which nonbreeding subordinate females were not found to have higher GC levels than dominant breeding females, social carnivores and other animals. However the correlation between glucocorticoid levels and position in the social hierarchy is dubious. Dominant breeding males and females often have higher glucocorticoid levels among the dwarf mongoose (Helogale parvula), African wild dogs (Lycaon pictus) and gray wolves (Canis lupus) in which older and heavier individuals make up the breeding individuals in the group with younger individuals helping to raise their pups.

==== Pheromones ====
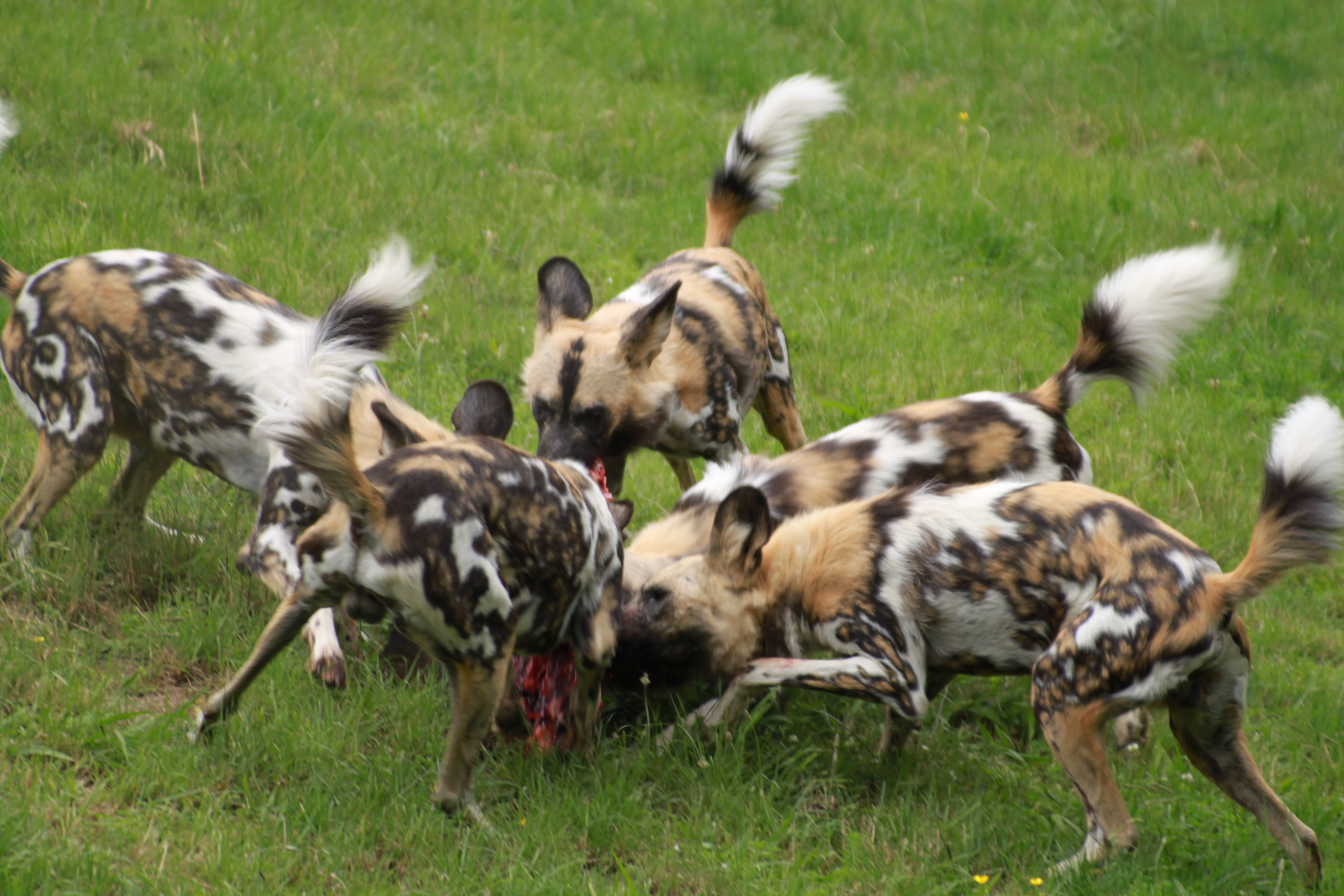
African wild dogs (Lycaon pictus) live in packs with a dominant breeding pair.

Pheromonal suppression of subordinate male and female reproduction is the mechanism by which dominant breeding pairs suppress the reproduction of non-breeders in communally and cooperatively breeding species, especially in the absence of stress. Wolves (Canis lupus), coyotes (Canis latrons) and African wild dogs (Lycaon pictus) live in packs with a dominant breeding pair that does most of the territorial urine scent marking in the group. During the breeding season, the dominant male urinates over the dominant female's urine, possibly to hide the female's reproductive status from other males. Pheromones in urine are implicated as a possible mechanism to shut down the subordinate's reproductive cycle. Only the dominant pair mate and have young, producing one litter per year. Subordinate females either do not exhibit estrous hormonal changes or they occur irregularly. Occasionally a subordinate animal leaves the pack and forms a new mating pair when it then exhibits of the territorial urine marking and mating behavior that was suppressed when living in the presence of the dominant breeding pair.

Yellow, banded and dwarf mongooses live in families similar to wolf packs with scent marking done almost exclusively by the dominant pair. Dwarf mongooses show synchronous estrous but only the dominant female regularly gives birth. Subordinate females do not conceive or abort early, but do lactate after the dominant female gives birth and participate in communal nursing. When the subordinate females leave the parental pack they will become fully reproductively active in new groups they help establish. In captivity, more than one dwarf mongoose in a group can give birth but the young of subordinates do not survive. However, if the size of their cage is increased and density is lower, reproductive activity of subordinates resumes. As in wolves, pheromonal control over the reproductive cycle of the mongoose is implicated as the mechanism for reproductive suppression.

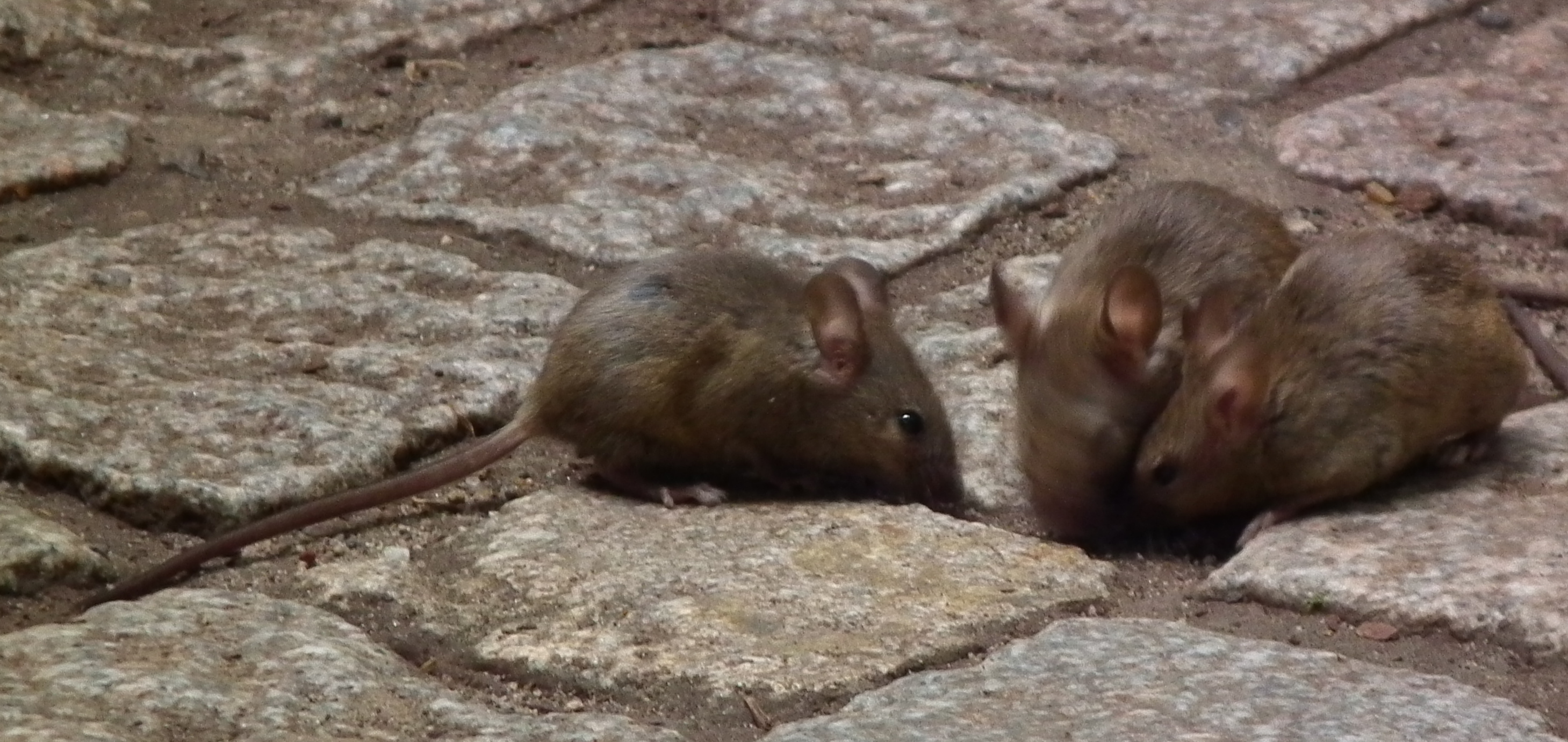
Female house mice need contact with male pheromones to initiate puberty.

The house mouse (Mus musculus) is territorial with a single dominant male marking its territorial boundary with urine while subordinate males do not urine mark. A female's rate of urine marking is elevated in response to a dominant male's urine marking, and his urine contains pheromones that accelerate her ovulation. The presence of a dominant adult male and his urine are crucial for young females to initiate puberty. Females isolated from males often do not experience puberty or have unstable ovulatory cycles. Contact with the urine of a dominant female signals a young prepubescent female to delay the onset of puberty. When housed with only an adult male, female mice reach puberty within 25 days, but puberty will not occur until 40–50 days if they are housed with adult females. Being grouped with other females suppresses the young female's serum Luteinizing hormone and prolactin. Exposure to the male elevates their luteinizing hormone levels followed by increased serum estradiol. Female mice have a short ovulatory cycle when housed with males and a long cycle when housed with only other females.

Queen pheromones are among the most important chemical messages regulating insect societies but are yet to be isolated. in natural colonies of the Saxon wasp, Dolichovespula saxonica, queens emit reliable chemical cues of their true fertility, but as the queen's signals decrease incidences of worker reproduction increases. In colonies of Bombus terrestris, the queen can control oogenesis and worker egg laying by regulating concentrations of juvenile hormone (JH) in workers. This is likely achieved through queen pheromones.

==== Social self-inhibition ====
Game theory suggests that subordinates suppress their own reproduction to avoid the social cost imposed on them if they reproduce, including expulsion from the group and infanticide against their progeny by dominant breeding individuals. Forced dispersal from the group may be extremely dangerous, involving high levels of predation and difficulty finding food and sleeping sites. In the absence of stress or pheromones as a mechanism, a "self-inhibition" model was proposed that suggests subordinates can choose to inhibit their own reproduction in cooperatively breeding groups in order to remain flexible and share in the group's productivity. When group members are closely related, independent breeding opportunities are poor, and detection of mating and pregnancy is high, subordinates choose to suppress their own reproduction. The self-inhibition model has been applied to female common marmosets (Callithrix jacchus). When they are introduced into a new group, female marmosets are immediately subordinate, experience a drop in chrorionic gonadotrophin (CG) and within the first four days and stops ovulating. Subordinate female ovaries are smaller than dominants and secrete little estrogen. Older female marmosets are less subject to ovulatory self-restraint and the scent of an unfamiliar dominant female does not affect their ovulation. However, continued exposure to the dominant female may represent a social, rather than biological, cue that causes the subordinates to shut down their ovulation.

=== Mate guarding ===
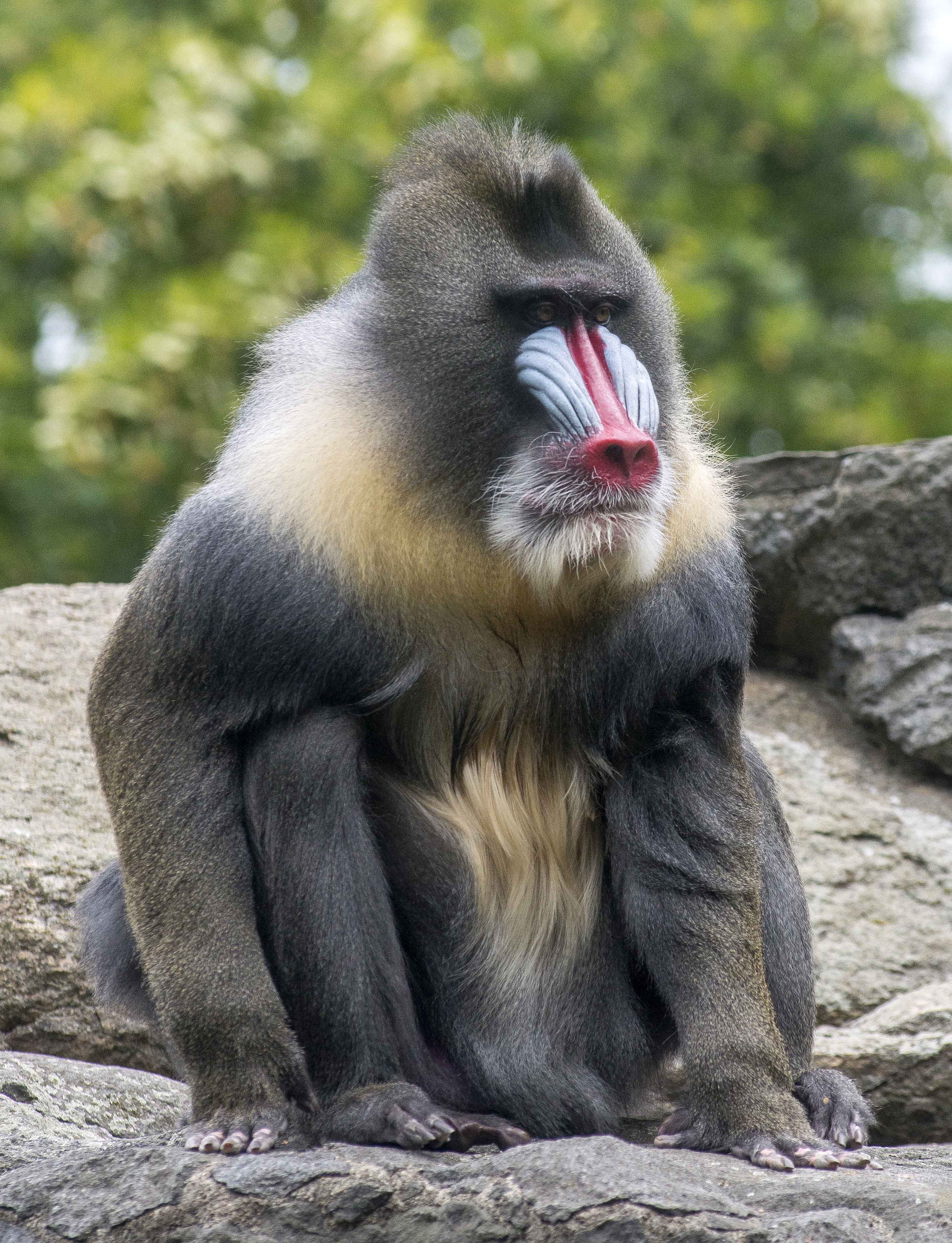
Alpha male mandrills guard the oldest and most fertile females to prevent other males from mating with them.

Limiting access to reproductive partners through mate guarding is a form of reproductive suppression. In the banded mongoose (Mungos mungo) the oldest males have the most offspring. Yet mating in this species is highly promiscuous. The older males increase their reproductive success by mate guarding the oldest most fertile females since they cannot guard all the females in the group. Therefore, successfully breeding older males are highly selective in their mate guarding and exert mate selection. Mate guarding is also a mechanism of reproductive suppression of subordinates in mandrills (Mandrillus sphinx) in which males over the age of 8 mate-guard, with alpha males performing 94% of the mate-guarding and being responsible for siring 69% of the offspring.

=== Eusociality ===
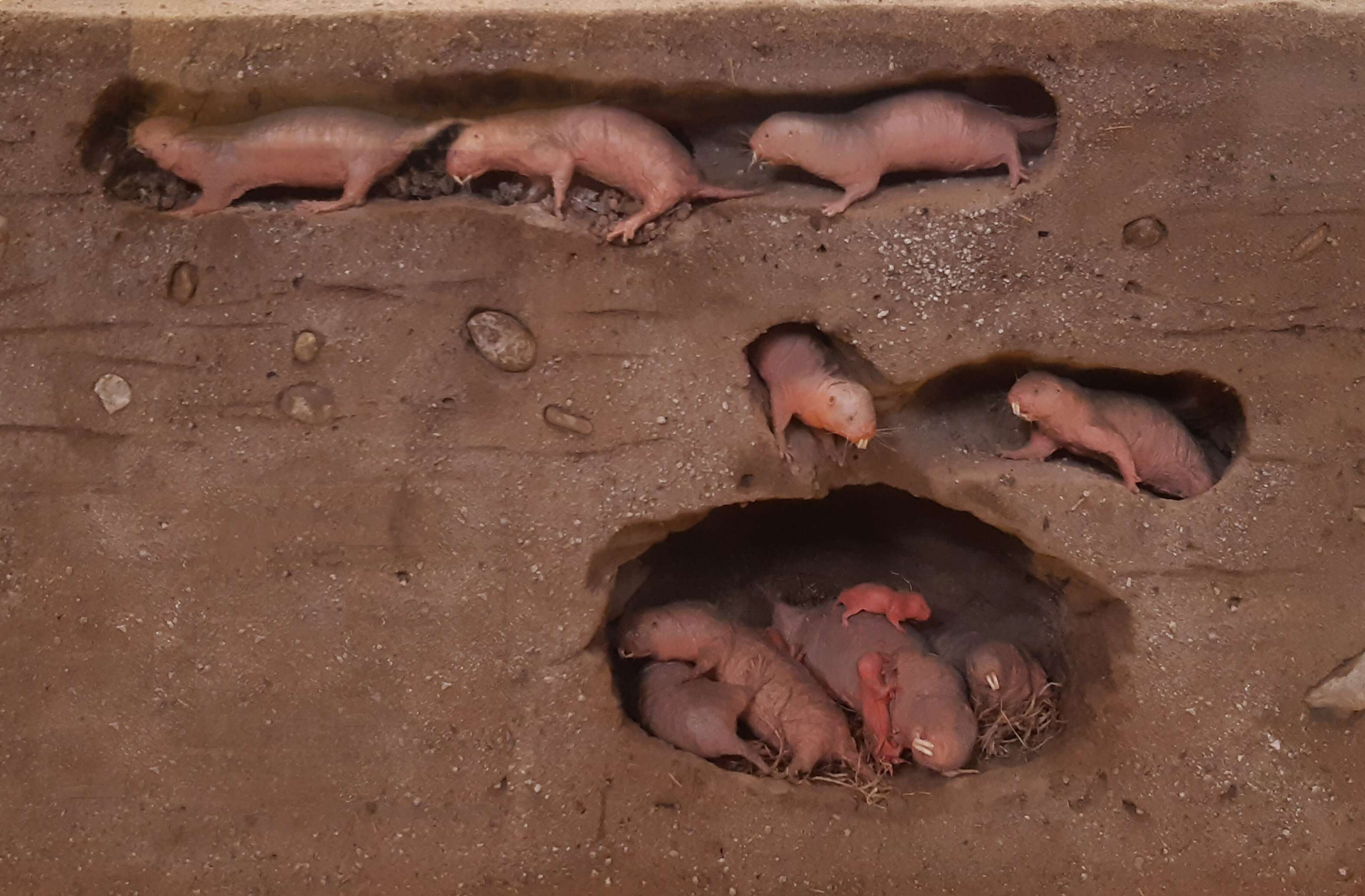
Model of naked mole-rat burrow with soldiers, workers, and a single reproductive female or queen, a social structure similar to the castes of the eusocial insects

Ovary activation in honeybee workers is inhibited by queen pheromones. In the Cape honeybee social parasites that are of the worker caste enter the colony and kill the resident queen, activate their own ovaries and parthenogenetically produce diploid female offspring (thelytoky) – behaviors linked to a single locus on chromosome 13. The parasites produced queen-like pheromones falsely signally the presence of a queen suppressing the reproduction of worker's native to the colony and policing or destroying these eggs. Alternative slicing of a gene homologous to the gemini transcription factor of Drosophila controls worker sterility. Knocking out an exon results in rapid worker ovary activation. A 9 nucleotide deletion from the normal altruistic worker genome may turn a honeybee into a parasite. As for many eusocial insects, termite workers are totipotent and rarely produce offspring although they are capable of reproduction when the breeding pair dies. Researchers hypothesized that the gene Neofem2, which is involved in cockroach communication, plays a critical role in queen-worker communication. They experimentally took the king or queen out of the colony. Some workers displayed pre-mating head butting behavior and can go on to become reproductive while others did not. However, when the Neofem2 gene was suppressed butting behavior did not occur, indicating that the gene is essential in allowing the queen to suppress worker reproduction. Neofem2 may play a role in cockroach egg pheromones.

Naked mole-rats resemble eusocial insects in becoming reversible nonbreeders at birth. Underground-dwelling mole-rats having an elaborate division of labor, high densities as colonies mature, high levels of inbreeding and extreme permanent reproductive despotism. Helping to rear the dominant females young may be the only way they can ensure an individual's survival.

== Post-fertilization ==
=== Destruction of eggs ===
Destroying eggs such that only one female's eggs survive is documented in cooperatively breeding birds such as acorn woodpeckers (Melanerpes formicivorus). About 25% of acorn woodpecker groups contain two or more joint-nesting females that cooperate to raise young, but cooperative female destroy each other's eggs prior to laying their own. These eggs are eaten by other members of the group, including the mother.

In Cape honey bees (Apis mellifera capensis), the multiple mating of the queen and existence of half-siblings creates sub-families within the colony. Sometimes the queen fails to control worker reproduction. In response workers remove eggs laid by other workers, leading to less than 1% of offspring being worker-laid. Worker policing of worker eggs occurs in the European hornet (Vespa crabo) honeybees and wasps.

=== Spontaneous abortion ===
Social stress and resource limitation can lead to high rates of spontaneous abortion as a mechanism of reproductive suppression. Meerkats subordinate females that have conceived prior to being evicted from the group by the breeding female during the breeding season fail to carry their pregnancies as a result of increased stress (higher GC levels) and reduced access to food and other resources. Evicted females regularly copulate with males from neighboring groups Subordinate females have low conception rates and increased abortion rates in response to low food availability and high predation risk. Dwarf mongooses show synchronous estrous but only the dominant female regularly bears young. If subordinate females do manage to conceive they abort the pregnancy.

=== Infanticide ===
Infanticide is a mechanism of reproductive success in many species. Alpha female dwarf mongooses and African wild dogs kill offspring other than their own, but alpha males do not. This may be because the breeding alpha may have sired a rare subordinate's offspring. Subordinate females time their pregnancies such that they give birth several days after the alpha female, to reduce the risk of infanticide. Pregnant subordinate meerkats kill the pups of the dominant breeding female. No dominant female pups have ever been observed killed after their 4th day of life. Evicted subordinate females are kept out for 3 days after the breeding female gave birth. Eight infanticides involving the killing of a subordinate female's offspring by the breeding female have been observed in wild common marmosets, as well as two instances of infanticide in which the subordinate female bred and then killed the breeding female's babies. Infanticidal marmoset females are often in the last trimester of pregnancy, but postpartum females do not commit infanticide.
