= Blue Shift (short story) =

1989 novelette by Stephen Baxter

- Short story by Stephen Baxter

Publication
- Published in: Writers of the Future, Vol. 5
- Publication date: 1989

"Blue Shift" is a novelette that appears in Stephen Baxter's collection of linked stories anthology novel Vacuum Diagrams. "Blue Shift" was originally published in Writers of the Future volume 5 in 1989.

== Plot summary ==
Set in A.D. 5406, the story begins on an Earth that has been occupied by the Qax, an amorphous lifeform that profits from information and technology trade, for four centuries. Jim Bolder, a space pilot on the run from creditors, accepts an assignment from the Qax through a human intermediary to determine just what the Xeelee are constructing at the center of the local supercluster. Bolder is provided with a Xeelee nightfighter that can travel faster than light.

As Bolder in the nightfighter approaches the Great Attractor, he discovers the Xeelee are constructing a massive ring from its matter, which they intend to use to flee the universe itself. The gravity from the ring pulled galaxies from all over the universe, and their light is blue-shifted, hence the title. But the Qax will not allow this information to be released, intending to keep it—and a possible defense against the Xeelee—for their own profit. Bolder dodges the Qax and launches a "starbreaker" that will gradually cause the Qax homeworld's sun to go nova, requiring them to divert their resources from the occupation of Earth, liberating the planet.
