= Ring (Baxter novel) =

1994 novel by Stephen Baxter

- First edition
- Author: Stephen Baxter
- Cover artist: Chris Moore
- Language: English
- Series: Xeelee Sequence
- Genre: Science fiction novel
- Publisher: HarperCollins (UK)
- Publication date: 4 July 1994
- Publication place: United Kingdom
- Media type: Print (Paperback)
- Pages: 443
- ISBN: 0-00-224026-2
- OCLC: 30814041
- Preceded by: Flux
- Followed by: Vacuum Diagrams

Ring is a 1994 science fiction novel by British author Stephen Baxter. The novel tells the story of the end of the universe and the saving of mankind from its destruction. Two parallel plots are followed throughout the novel: that of Lieserl, an AI exploring the interior of the Sun, and that of the Great Northern, a generation ship on a five-million-year journey.

== Plot summary ==
The AI Lieserl is abandoned for five million years, leaving her to observe the Sun's interior. She discovers dark matter-based life, which she names "photino birds". These birds gradually drain the energy from the core of a star, ending fusion and causing premature aging into a stable white dwarf—the birds' preferred habitat, as it has no risk of going supernova and destroying them.

A generation ship is sent with one end of a wormhole to explore the future and investigate the whereabouts of Michael Poole. It will be a round-trip journey, returning to the Solar System after five million years, though only a thousand years will elapse on board, due to relativistic time dilation effects. The crew is broken into three factions—the primitives, the virtuals, and a survivalist faction, Superet. Among the factions, the primitives are a eugenic project for Garry Uvarov who hopes to lengthen the lives of humanity without the use of Anti-Senescence (anagathic or life-extension) technology. The Superet faction relies heavily on failing technology and maintains a totalitarian government which refuses to acknowledge the existence of other decks on the ship; the virtuals remain aloof.

Upon their arrival, their end of the wormhole is destroyed leaving them trapped in the future. They observe that the entire universe is full of red stars, so the stars have aged far faster than expected. The Great Northern makes contact with Lieserl, who explains her observations of the photino birds. The birds do not just exist in the Sun but every star, helioforming them to an amenable habitat. The Xeelee, masters of baryonic matter, have known about the photino birds and have been striving to thwart them. The baryonic universe is doomed, but the Xeelee create a 'Ring', an escape hatch. A cosmic string is made into a loop and creates the phenomenon of the Great Attractor. The function of the Ring is to create a Kerr metric at its centre, which creates a portal to other universes. Whenever humans have met up with the Xeelee and pursued war, this was merely an annoyance since the Xeelee were thinking on a larger scale about more potent enemies. The crew of the Great Northern and Lieserl discover the folly of their species.

A Xeelee nightfighter is discovered in Callisto (referenced in the later story "Reality Dust"), rigged to piggyback the Great Northern to the Great Attractor. Fifty days later, they discover that the Xeelee's project has been destroyed, but a recently awakened virtual of Michael Poole shows Spinner-of-Rope, a primitive, how to pilot around the fragmented cosmic strings and travel into the past, using a closed time-like path. These last humans return to the Ring, in an era in which it was not destroyed; the Xeelee allow them through, and they briefly attempt to pick universes and find sanctuary in another younger universe, after passing through the Ring, and get to work on starting a new world.

Michael Poole remains in the universe and witnesses the deaths of the last stars, and the decay of the last protons—the final victory of the dark matter lifeforms over the baryonic Xeelee and lesser races. Eventually, his consciousness disperses, and history ends.
