= Last Contact =

2007 short story by Stephen Baxter

- Short story by Stephen Baxter
- Language: English
- Genre: Science fiction

Publication
- Published in: The Solaris Book of New Science Fiction 2007
- Publication type: Book
- Publication date: January 2007

"Last Contact" is a science fiction short story published in 2007 by Stephen Baxter. It was nominated for the 2008 Hugo Award for Best Short Story.

== Plot ==
A mother and daughter, Maureen and 35-year-old Caitlin, live through the last few months of Earth's existence. Maureen and her late husband Harry are described as having substantial astrophysical knowledge. Caitlin, an astrophysicist herself, has been involved with the recent discovery of the Big Rip, a field of dark energy that is essentially tearing the universe apart. With distant galaxies disappearing from view in deep field images, scientists have determined that the effect will culminate in a matter of months, unbeknownst to the general public. On March 15, Caitlin participated in a BBC Radio 4 discussion about the discovery, revealing it to the public.

On June 5, amid their search for extraterrestrial intelligence as part of the Rip, distinctly shaped signals were detected. Caitlin reveals that she was invited to a shelter to be built by the University of Oxford that will allow people to outlive Earth by about thirty minutes.

The morning of October 14, the Sun rushes away within minutes. Caitlin joins Maureen in the pergola Maureen has built. Caitlin reveals that earlier, she, Bill, and the kids celebrated Christmas early; after the lunch, Bill put blue pills that had been distributed to everyone by the National Health Service in the kids' lemonades, and they fell asleep. Bill then took his own pill and allowed Caitlin to leave, as she wanted to see it through to the end. She has also declined the Oxford invitation. Caitlin shows Maureen a silicon sphere with instruments inside. The sphere is designed to "keep recording until the expansion gets down to the centimeter scale, and the Rip cracks the sphere open". They embrace as an earthquake reigns. Caitlin asks about the interstellar messages Maureen said had no need to be decoded. As a violent wind blows and the Earth cracks open, Maureen yells that it is obvious to her that the messages must have been variations of "goodbye".
