= The Time Ships =

1995 novel by Stephen Baxter

- First edition
- Author: Stephen Baxter
- Language: English
- Genre: Science fiction
- Published: 1995 (HarperCollins)
- Publication place: United Kingdom
- Media type: Print (hardback & paperback)
- Pages: 454
- ISBN: 0-00-224609-0
- OCLC: 59965735

The Time Ships is a 1995 hard science fiction novel by Stephen Baxter. A canonical sequel to the 1895 novella The Time Machine by H. G. Wells, it was officially authorized by the Wells estate to mark the centenary of the original's publication. The Time Ships won critical acclaim. It won the John W. Campbell Memorial Award and the Philip K. Dick Award in 1996, as well as the British Science Fiction Association Award in 1995. It was also nominated for the Hugo, Clarke and Locus Awards in 1996.

== Plot summary ==
After the events related in The Time Machine, the Time Traveler (his first name Moses is given in the novel but applied to the Time Traveler's younger self) in 1891 prepares to return to the year 802,701 and save Weena, the Eloi who died in the fire with the Morlocks. He reveals that the quartz construction of the time machine is suffused with a radioactive substance he calls Plattnerite for the mysterious benefactor who gave him the sample to study twenty years earlier, in 1871.

The Time Traveler departs into the future and stops in 657,208 when he notes the daytime sky has gone permanently dark. He arrives and is abducted by a branch of Morlocks more culturally advanced than the ones he met before. One of their number, Nebogipfel (the name of a character from Wells' The Chronic Argonauts), explains after hearing the Time Traveler's own story that the conflict between Eloi and Morlocks never occurred due to the Writer's publication of the story that became The Time Machine. The timeline he sought to go to is inaccessible to him now. The Morlocks of this timeline have constructed a Dyson sphere around the inner Solar System and use the Sun's energy to power it. Humans as the Time Traveler knows them live on the sunlit inner surface of the Sphere while the Morlocks live on the outer shell. The Time Traveler convinces Nebogipfel that he will help him understand the time travelling mechanism of the time machine if the Morlock takes him back to it.

When he thinks he is unobserved, the Time Traveler reactivates his machine and travels to 1873 to persuade his younger self to stop his research on Plattnerite. Nebogipfel, who took hold of the Time Traveler once he realized what he was doing, follows him there. As the Time Traveler attempts to persuade his younger self, whom he calls "Moses" to avoid confusion, to stop his research by providing Nebogipfel as proof that reality is changed by time travel, a tank-like Juggernaut pulls into Moses' yard. The army personnel on board, commanded by Hilary Bond and accompanied by an older version of the Time Traveler's friend Filby, take Moses, Nebogipfel, and the Time Traveler to their 1938, where World War I has stretched over twenty-four years due to the discovery of time travel which was influenced by the latter's work. Britain's major cities are all encased in domes, and with the contributions of Austrian expatriate Kurt Gödel, the government hopes to win the war by altering Germany's history conclusively.

Nebogipfel explains to the Time Traveler that they've entered another future as a result of their actions in Moses' past. During another bombing raid on London by the Germans, Gödel provides a vial of Plattnerite and leads them to the only escape available, a Time-Car prototype. Upon hearing this and what society would be like after the war (a pessimistic view mirroring Wells' own), the Time Traveler and Nebogipfel mount the vehicle and insert the Plattnerite. Moses is killed in an explosion when he tries to save Gödel, and the Time-Car travels back to the Paleocene and is wrecked on a tree. After weeks of bare survival, the Time Traveler and Nebogipfel are discovered by a scouting party from the Chronic Expeditionary Force commanded by Hilary Bond that arrived from 1944 to find them based on their remains in her time. Some time later, a German Messerschmitt plane arrives over the campsite, drops a Carolinum bomb (analogous to an atomic bomb in our world; see Wells' The World Set Free), and devastates the time-traveling Juggernauts and all but twelve of the Force. Nebogipfel and the Time Traveler survive by hiding in the ocean.

Over the next year and a half, the stranded soldiers under Hilary Bond's command start the colony of First London. In off moments, Nebogipfel has worked on repairing the Time-Car and acquired shavings of Plattnerite to power it on a journey through time. When the Time-Car is ready, the Time Traveler joins Nebogipfel in a fifty-million year journey through which they see First London expand and develop colonies on the moon and in Earth orbit. Eventually, human tampering with the Earth's environment renders the planet uninhabitable, and humanity departs for the stars. When the Time-Car finally stops due to depletion of its Plattnerite fuel, Nebogipfel and the Time Traveler are tended by a Universal Constructor, a life form (or lifeforms) composed of thousands of nanotechnological entities. They see that there are few stars left in the night sky; this is due to the human descendants colonizing many worlds and constructing Dyson Spheres around the host stars. The goal of the Universal Constructor is to harvest the energy of the sun to build time-travel vehicles from Plattnerite and travel to the beginning of the universe. However, this goal is not due to be completed for a million years.

Nebogipfel and the Time Traveler acquire enough Plattnerite from the Constructors to journey to the point in the future (i.e. another million years hence) when the Constructors will have finished building their time ships. Once the Time Traveler and Nebogipfel reach this point, the Constructors integrate them into a time ship and thus begins the journey back to time's beginning. At this central point from where all matter and energy and timelines branch off, the Constructors apparently start a new history in which they become something even more grand and knowledgeable than before. These successors of the Constructors place the Time Traveler and Nebogipfel into the Time Traveler's original history in the year 1871. It is revealed that the Time Traveler himself is the mysterious stranger who gave his younger self the Plattnerite sample under the alias "Gottfried Plattner", and that because of this, the circle of causality is closed and thus, the whole multiplicity of histories which ends up creating the Constructors and their successors begins anew. Nebogipfel, with his consciousness enhanced by his time with the Constructors, leaves the Time Traveler behind to travel with the successors of the Constructors. These successors plan to travel "beyond" the "local" multiplicity into a new realm of historical dimensions.

The Time Traveler then makes one final journey to 802,701, along his historical axis, and just barely saves Weena from the death she suffered before. Since (the reader is led to suppose) travelling in time again would cause this reality to branch off and become inaccessible again, the Time Traveler destroys the machine and encourages the Eloi in an Agrarian Revolution to reduce their dependence on the Morlocks for food and clothing, hoping to one day eliminate it entirely. As he works, the Time Traveler writes down the recounting of his adventures and seals them in a Plattnerite packet, a "time capsule", so to speak, in the hope that it will travel in time to a faithful scribe. Before sealing the packet, the Time Traveler writes that he plans to go into the world of the Morlocks again, hopefully to return and add an appendix to the story. The book ends by saying that no appendix was found.

== References to the works of H. G. Wells ==
- The name Gottfried Plattner comes from The Plattner Story (included in Wells' collection of short stories entitled The Country of the Blind and Other Stories, written between 1894 and 1909, first published in 1911). There is no original link between this story and The Time Machine, nor does the account related to us by Baxter at the end of The Time Ships echo an event from The Plattner Story. In Wells' original story, Gottfried Plattner is given a full backstory including ancestry and occupation. He is a school teacher made to chemically analyze a "green powder" of uncertain origin by his students, and, upon lighting the powder on fire, is violently launched into a mysterious parallel dimension next to ours where mute "Watchers of the Living", obviously deceased souls or alternate versions of existing people in our world, take keen interest in us.
- The Morlock Nebogipfel takes his name from Wells' story "The Chronic Argonauts".
- In the London Dome, the characters are introduced to the Babble Machines, an entertainment/propaganda device, which originally appeared in Wells' When the Sleeper Wakes.
- Wells himself (as "the Writer") is described as giving a lecture on a Babble Machine, and it is mentioned that he may have "a great deal of influence on official thinking on The Shape of Things to Come".
- The dome is somewhat similar in concept to the post world war "Bombproofs" mentioned as existing in London after the second world war in The Shape of Things to Come though this is on a much vaster scale. A similar design is reused by Baxter and Arthur C Clarke in their novel Sunstorm, for the vast dome used to shield London from the Storm of the novel's title.
- When the London Dome is breached, the sound of the alarms is described as "ulla, ulla, ulla", which is the cry of the Martian Tripods in The War of the Worlds.
- In the Paleocene Age, the Time Traveler succumbs to a bacterial infection as his body is ill-adapted to the environment, much like the Martians in The War of the Worlds.
- The people of the Green Moon are referred to as Selenites, as are the inhabitants of the moon in The First Men in the Moon.
- The novel suggests that the universe of the Time Traveler is not ours, but a slightly different one, coherent with Wells novels (whereas Nebogipfel's original timeline created by the publication of the time traveler's first travel in The Time-Machine, according to what he relates of it to the time traveler, appears to be much more similar to ours). Nuclear energy is produced by a material called carolinum and not uranium. Carolinum allows plattnerite to be produced relatively easily. Carolinum bombs, contrary to A-bombs, continue to detonate for years with an eerie purple glow. The name carolinum and the continuous detonation are references to The World Set Free.
- In the Palace of Green Porcelain, the Time Traveler views a model of a city resembling London as it is described in When the Sleeper Wakes.
- As the Time Traveler 're-enters' his body following the journey to the Origin of the Universe, much of the description recalls the ending of Under the Knife.

== Awards ==
- British Science Fiction Award winner, 1995
- John W. Campbell Memorial Award winner, 1996
- Philip K. Dick Award winner, 1997
- British Fantasy Award nominee, 1996
- Arthur C. Clarke Award nominee, 1996
- Hugo Award nominee, 1996
- Locus Award nominee, 1996
- Kurd-Laßwitz-Preis winner, 1996
- Premio Gigamesh winner, 1997
- Seiun Award winner, 1999
