= Resplendent =

2006 science fiction collection by Stephen Baxter

First edition (published by Gollancz).

Resplendent is an English language science fiction collection by British writer Stephen Baxter, published in 2006. It is the fourth and final book in the Destiny's Children series.

This book is a collection of short stories relating to the previous three books, comprising new works and previously published stories, including the novellas Reality Dust, Riding the Rock and Mayflower II, an 88-page novella taking place in the Xeelee Sequence that won the 2004 BSFA Award for the Best Short Fiction.

The short stories have been arranged into an overall narrative with brief single page interludes by the character Luru Parz, from the first story in the book. When read in series they form a history as seen by her up until the final story of the book.

== Contents ==
- "Cadre Siblings" (from Interzone 153, March 2000)
- Reality Dust (2000)
- "Silver Ghost" (Asimov’s, September 2000)
- "On the Orion Line" (Asimov’s, October 2000)
- "In the Un-Black" (from Redshift, 2001)
- "The Ghost Pit" (Asimov’s, July 2001)
- "The Cold Sink" (Asimov’s, August 2001)
- "Breeding Ground" (Asimov’s, February 2003)
- "The Great Game" (Asimov’s, March 2003)
- "The Chop Line" (Asimov’s, 2003)
- "The Dreaming Mould", Interzone 179, May 2002)
- "Conurbation 2473" (from Live without a Net, August 2003)
- "All in a Blaze" (from Stars: Stories Based on the Songs of Janis Ian, 2003)
- Riding the Rock (November 2002)
- "Lakes of Light" (from Constellations, 2005)
- "Between Worlds" (from Between Worlds, September 2004)
- Mayflower II (August 2004)
- "Ghost Wars" (from Asimov’s, January 2006)

=== Reality Dust ===
Reality Dust is the sixth work in the Xeelee Sequence. The plot begins not very long after the Third Expansion began (the First Expansion ended when humanity was conquered by the Squeem; the Second Expansion ended with the conquest of humanity by the Qax, and the Third Expansion, ~5400 CE, began after the events of Timelike Infinity, pursuant to Jim Bolder's destruction of the Qax home-system). The protagonist, one "Hama", an investigator for Earth's Truth Commission, is investigating the surviving Qax-collaborators (as the Qax restricted access to AS- anti-senescence technology – to collaborators, they are rather old, and are known as "Pharaohs"); he follows one renegade Pharaoh to Callisto.

=== Riding the Rock ===
Riding the Rock is the seventh work in the Xeelee Sequence. The plot is set in the Third Expansion era, in which humanity has thrown off the successive yokes of the Squeem and the Qax, and has been so successful that it is second only to the Xeelee among baryonic races. However, humanity's jealousy has driven it to futilely and brutally dedicate their culture (sending soldiers off as young as 13) to warring for over 18,000 years upon the Xeelee. The characters engage in quasi-trench warfare against the Xeelee in the galactic core.

=== Mayflower II ===
Mayflower II is the eighth work in the Xeelee Sequence. The plot centers on five generation ships leaving a doomed planet. As thousands of years pass, the humans forget that they are on a spaceship and begin running its mechanisms only through religious ritual. After 25,000 years, the humans on the ship have split in their evolution with half becoming short-lived childlike tribal people and half becoming cannibalistic animals. The ending speaks to the fact that although this situation seems gruesome and terrible that life and evolution find a way and that humans found a way to continue on living even if it meant giving up what is traditionally thought of as human.

The story begins on Pluto in the distant future. Its inhabitants, former collaborators of the Qax, humanity's erstwhile conquerors, are under attack from the new-formed Coalition, seeking revenge for humanity's enslavement. As such, the inhabitants send five generation ships out of the Solar System in the hopes that they will be able to form colonies of their own that can survive the Coalition. Rusel, the protagonist, is admitted onto Mayflower II, one of the ships, at the last minute. Shortly after takeoff, it is revealed that the ship's intended destination is outside the galaxy, requiring a flight time of 50,000 subjective years, even with the effects of time dilation.

The ship's captain selects a few individuals to receive medical treatment granting them immortality, allowing them to guide the ship through its millennia-long voyage. Over time, however, these individuals die through malfunctions or boredom, leaving Rusel as the only immortal on board, but he becomes increasingly dependent on life-support and gradually merges with the ship.

Over time, the other inhabitants of the ship form several different societies, gradually becoming detached from their original humanity. Eventually, they form an almost unrecognisable tribal civilisation. Having forgotten that they are on a spaceship at all, they only maintain it through religious tradition.

After 25,000 years have passed, the Mayflower II is contacted by Pirius and Torec (protagonists of Exultant), former soldiers of the Coalition, which is revealed to have fallen. They offer to remove the inhabitants from the ship and care for them elsewhere. Rusel, now completely merged with the ship's systems, allows them to do so. Pirius and Torec then leave Rusel to continue into space without the burden of the crew, which he gladly accepts.

=== The Siege of Earth ===
The Siege of Earth is the final story contained within the book, it details an encounter between a young person from Mars and the novel's overall narrator, Luru Parz. This final part of the book explains the origin of Old Earth which features in parts of Xeelee: Endurance.
