= Chris Moore (illustrator) =

British book and album cover illustrator (1947–2025)

Moore's 1999 cover for the SF Masterworks edition of The Stars My Destination

Christopher Norton Moore (1 June 1947 – 7 February 2025) was a British illustrator, particularly noted for his book covers, especially in the field of science fiction.

Moore created cover images for works by many of the most famous authors in science fiction, including since 1998 some of the book covers for Orion Publishing's SF Masterworks series.

== Career ==
Moore attended graphic design classes at Maidstone College of Art and was accepted by the Royal College of Art with a focus on illustration from 1969 to 1972.

In the 1970s he also created a number of album covers, for recording artists including Rod Stewart (The Vintage Years), the group Magnum, Journey, Fleetwood Mac (Penguin), The Allman Brothers Band, Lindisfarne (Magic in the Air and The News), Status Quo (Just Supposin', 12 Gold Bars and Never Too Late), and Pentangle (Pentangling).

Moore's interplanetary spaceflight images were used to illustrate books by Philip K. Dick, including Do Androids Dream of Electric Sheep? which was used as the foundation for the 1982 film Blade Runner. Moore was known for his airbrushed style and his artwork was used for books by science fiction authors Isaac Asimov, Ursula K. Le Guin, H.G. Wells, and Alastair Reynolds. His design was sold as wallpaper merchandise for the 1980 film The Empire Strikes Back.

Non science fiction authors whose work he provided covers for include Jeffrey Archer, Frederick Forsyth, Jackie Collins, Claire Francis, Jerzy Kosiński, Stephen Leather, Wilbur Smith, Terence Strong, Joseph Heller, and Colin Forbes.

Moore died on 7 February 2025, at the age of 77.

== Collections ==
- Peter Elson and Chris Moore (1980). Parallel Lines. Dragon's Dream (NL). ISBN 90-6332-791-9.
- Martyn Dean & Chris Evans (1988). Dream Makers. Dragon's World/Paper Tiger. ISBN 1-85028-067-3.
- Stephen Gallagher (2000). Journeyman: The Art of Chris Moore. Paper Tiger. ISBN 1-85585-849-5.
