= Stephen Baxter (author) =

British science-fiction author (born 1957)

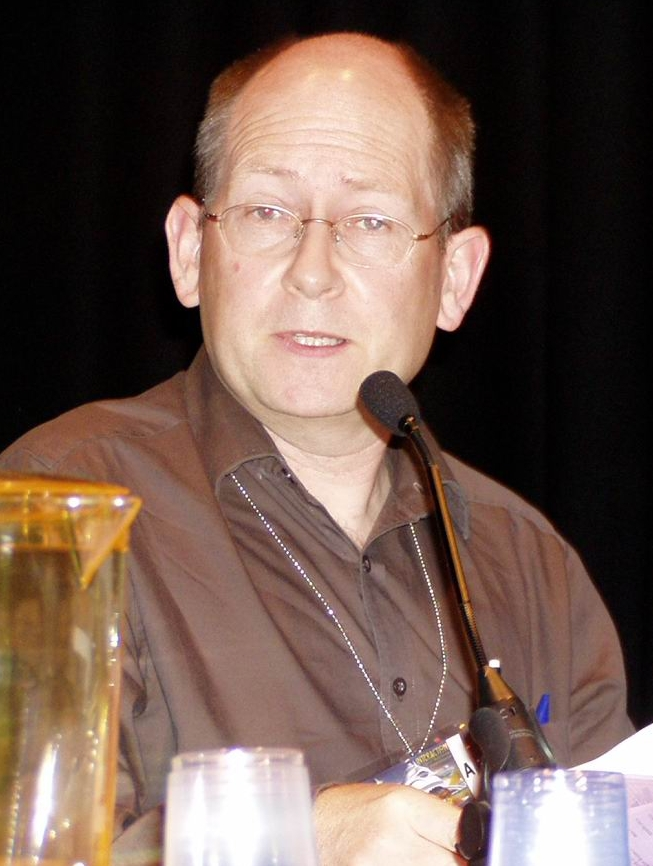
- Baxter at the 63rd World Science Fiction Convention, 2005
- Born: 1957 (age 68–69); Liverpool, England
- Occupation: Writer
- Writing career
- Genres: Hard science fiction Alternate history
- Website: www.stephen-baxter.com

Stephen Baxter (born 1957) is an English hard science fiction author. He has degrees in mathematics and engineering.

== Early life and education ==
Stephen Baxter was born in Liverpool, England, in 1957.

He earned a BA degree in mathematics from the University of Cambridge and subsequently obtained a PhD in engineering at the University of Southampton. He later received an MBA from Henley Management College.

== Career ==
Baxter taught maths, physics, and information technology before becoming a full-time author in 1995.

=== Writing ===
An admirer of science fiction pioneer H. G. Wells, Baxter has been vice-president of the international H. G. Wells Society since 2006. His fiction falls into three main categories of original work plus a fourth category, extending other authors' writing; each has a different basis, style, and tone.

Baxter's "Future History" mode is based on research into hard science. It encompasses the Xeelee Sequence, which consists of nine novels (including the Destiny's Children trilogy and Vengeance/Redemption duology that is set in alternate timeline), plus three volumes collecting the 52 short pieces (short stories and novellas) in the series, all of which fit into a single timeline stretching from the Big Bang singularity of the past to his Timelike Infinity (1993) singularity of the future. These stories begin in the present day and end when the Milky Way galaxy collides with Andromeda five billion years in the future. The central narrative is that of humanity rising and evolving to become the second most powerful race in the universe, next to the god-like Xeelee. Character development tends to be secondary to the depiction of advanced theories and ideas, such as the true nature of the Great Attractor, naked singularities and the great battle between baryonic and dark matter lifeforms. The Manifold Trilogy is another example of Baxter's future history mode, even more conceptual than the Xeelee sequence. Each novel is focused on a potential explanation of the Fermi paradox. The two-part disaster series Flood and Ark (followed by three additional stories, "Earth III," "Earth II," and "Earth I") which also fits into this category, where catastrophic events unfold in the near future and humanity must adapt to survive in three radically different planetary environments. In 2013, Baxter released his short story collection Universes which featured stories set in Flood/Ark, Jones & Bennet and Anti-Ice universes. Baxter signed a contract for two new books, Proxima and Ultima, both of which are names of planets, and they were released in 2013 and 2014, respectively.

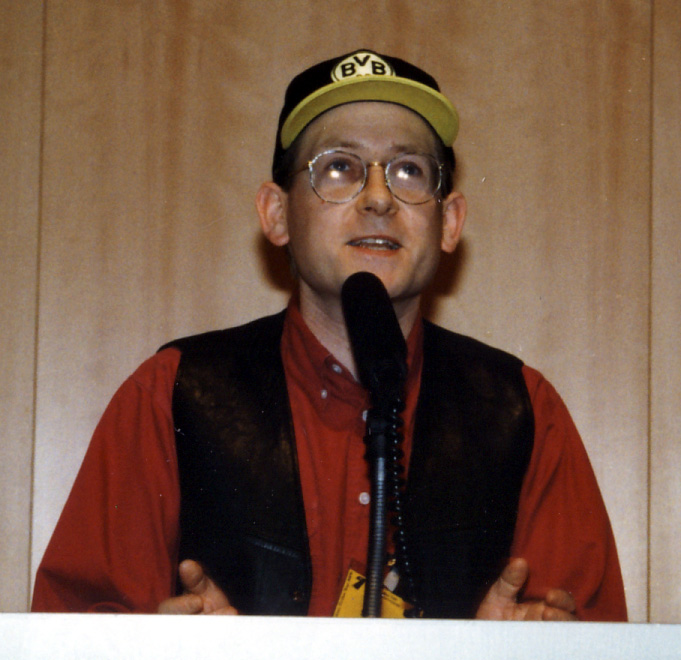
Stephen Baxter at the Science-Fiction-Tage NRW in Dortmund, Germany, March 1997

A second category in Baxter's work is based on readings in evolutionary biology and human/animal behaviour. Elements of this appear in his future histories (especially later works like the Destiny's Children series and Flood/Ark), but here it is the focus. The major work in this category is Evolution, which imagines the evolution of humanity in the Earth's past and future. The Mammoth Trilogy, written for young adults, shares similar themes and concerns as it explores the present, past, and future of a small herd of mammoths found surviving on an island in the Arctic Ocean.

A third category of Baxter's fiction is alternative history, based on research into history. These stories are more human, with characters portrayed with greater depth and care. This includes his NASA Trilogy, which incorporates research into NASA and its history; and the Time's Tapestry series, which features science-fictional interventions into our past from an alternative-history future. The novel Anti-Ice is an earlier example of Baxter's blending of alternate history with science fiction. A more recent work in this direction is the Northland Trilogy, an alternate prehistory that begins with Stone Spring, set ten thousand years ago in the Stone Age, followed by Bronze Summer and Iron Winter, set in alternative versions of the Bronze Age and the Iron Age. In 2009, Baxter became a judge for the Sidewise Award for Alternate History, the first former winner among the panel.

Another category, outside of the main body of Baxter's independent work, is sequels and instalments of science-fiction classics. His first novel to achieve wide recognition (winning three literary awards) was The Time Ships, an authorised sequel to H. G. Wells' The Time Machine. The Time Odyssey series, a trilogy co-authored with Arthur C. Clarke, is connected to Clarke's four Space Odyssey novels. The trilogy consists of Time's Eye, Sunstorm, and Firstborn. Another novel is based on a synopsis written by Clarke, The Light of Other Days. Baxter has also published a Doctor Who novel, The Wheel of Ice. The Massacre of Mankind is an authorised sequel to H. G. Wells' The War of the Worlds.

In 2010, Baxter began working on a new series with Terry Pratchett. This collaboration produced five books, The Long Earth, The Long War, The Long Mars, The Long Utopia and The Long Cosmos.

Baxter has written non-fiction essays and columns for such publications as the fanzine Critical Wave and the British SF Association's Matrix.

== Other activities ==
Baxter is a chartered engineer and fellow of the British Interplanetary Society.

== Literary awards ==
Award Name	Year	For book	Short stories printed in
BSFA Award SF Novel	1995	The Time Ships	
Sidewise Award for Best Short Form Alternate History	1995	"Brigantia's Angels"	Traces
John W. Campbell Award	1996	The Time Ships	
Philip K. Dick Award	1996	The Time Ships	
Kurd-Laßwitz-Preis for Best Foreign Language Novel	1996	The Time Ships	
Sidewise Award for Best Long Form Alternate History	1996	Voyage	
BSFA Award Short Fiction	1997	"War Birds"	Phase Space
Premio Gigamesh	1997	The Time Ships	
SF Chronicle Award Best Novelette	1998	"Moon Six"	Traces
Analog Award Best Short Story	1998	"Moon-Calf"	Phase Space
Philip K. Dick Award	1999	Vacuum Diagrams	
Seiun Award for Best Foreign Language Novel	1999	The Time Ships	
Analog Award Best Short Story	2000	"Sheena 5"	Phase Space
Locus Award for Best Novelette	2000	"Huddle"	Phase Space
Asimov's Readers' Poll Novelette	2001	"On the Orion Line"	Resplendent
BSFA Award Non-Fiction	2001	Omegatropic	
Analog Award Best Short Story	2002	"The Hunters of Pangaea"	Evolution & The Hunters of Pangaea
BSFA Award Short Fiction	2004	"Mayflower II"	Resplendent

Baxter's story "Last Contact" was nominated for the 2008 Hugo Award for best short story.
