= Phase Space (story collection) =

Book by Stephen Baxter

- cover of the first edition
- Author: Stephen Baxter
- Language: English
- Series: Manifold
- Genre: Science fiction
- Published: 2003 Voyager
- Publication place: United Kingdom
- Media type: Print (hardback & paperback)
- ISBN: 0-00-651185-6
- OCLC: 52287993
- Preceded by: Manifold: Origin

Phase Space (subtitled Stories from the Manifold and Elsewhere) is a 2003 science fiction collection by British writer Stephen Baxter, containing twenty-three thematically linked stories, in which the human relationship with the universe is explored: whether humanity is truly alone in the universe, if there are other intelligent species, if these have turned their backs on us, or if expansion itself is destined to fail.

Written in the same style as most of Stephen Baxter's work, Phase Space is a collection of more or less scientifically based stories in the tradition of Arthur C. Clarke. The stories are mostly set in the same Multiverse as the books in his Manifold series, with a few stories related to his separate NASA Trilogy.

The book contains the following short stories:

- Dreams (I)
  - "Moon-Calf" (1998) – A retired astronaut finds hints of an ancient space voyage while on holiday in England.
- Earths
  - "Open Loops" (2000) – An astronaut explores, and later becomes a colonist on an asteroid, observing the expansion and evolution of humanity over the millennia.
  - "Glass Earth, Inc." (1997) – A policeman must sort through the memories of a murder to find out who the killer is, and in the process, learns more about himself than he ever knew.
  - "Poyekhali 3201" (1997) – The experiences of a Russian cosmonaut are no more than the ultimate re-enactment. (An earlier version of this story appeared in Decalog 5: Wonders (1997).)
  - "Dante Dreams" (1998) – A police woman from San Francisco travels to the Vatican to investigate the suicide of a Jesuit priest and an illegally created sentient hologram based on the late priest.
  - "War Birds" (1997) – When Apollo 11 explodes on the Moon, the US blames the Russians, then fast-tracks its Space Shuttle program for military applications and becomes a fascist state.
- Worlds
  - "Sun-Drenched" (1998) – When two Apollo astronauts are stranded on the Moon, they decide to expose themselves to the elements in the hope of colonising the Moon with bacteria and viruses from their own bodies.
  - "Martian Autumn" (2002) – Too much environmental stress and life on Earth might undergo an evolutionary "reboot", like what happened on Mars.
  - "Sun God" (1997) – A pendant to Titan, in which a Titanian beetle finds an abandoned Saturn rocket and studies the strange creatures (humans) who made it.
  - "Sun-Cloud" (2001) – A sentient multi-corpuscular being travels to the distant future to fulfill her dying sister's dream: to witness the emergence of stars.
- Manifold
  - "Sheena 5" – The sentient squid plotline of Manifold: Time as a separate short story, with a different ending.
  - "The Fubar Suit" (1997) – An astronaut is stranded in space wearing a suit guaranteed to re-create her when her corpse is discovered. Meanwhile, a microscopic world evolves inside the suit, threatening her existence.
  - "Grey Earth" (2001) – The end of Manifold: Origin from the viewpoint of Mary, the Neanderthal friend of Nemoto, set on the axis-tilted Earth of the Neanderthals.
  - "Huddle" (1999) – Madeleine Meacher from Manifold: Space returns to an Earth where the descendants of humans occupy the ecological niche of seals or penguins, a hundred thousand years after the events of the novel.
- Paradox
  - "Refugium" (2002) – Two men, an enthusiast and a cynic, set out in an alien spacecraft to discover an answer to the Fermi paradox: where have all the extraterrestrial civilisations gone?
  - "Lost Continent" (2001) – Two friends discuss the possibility that Atlantis may have been more than a myth, and may have been more recent than anyone ever dreamed.
  - "Tracks" (2001) – Two astronauts are on the Moon in 1973 collecting rock samples; things go wrong and the mission is aborted. But what the astronauts remember is much stranger than what the video tapes show.
  - "Lines of Longitude" (1997) – A physicist teaching a community college course must cope with reality when one of her students dies after having disappeared for several days. The aftermath of his death have graver consequences than she can imagine.
  - "The Barrier" (1998) – Two old men travel through space in a malfunctioning ship toward the edge of all; an exploration of the Zoo Hypothesis.
  - "Marginalia" (1999) – Baxter's novel Voyage as conspiracy theory- the idea that NASA really did go to Mars in the 1970s is explored.
  - "The We Who Sing" (2002) – Intelligence exists in a universe of shining gas clouds, before space became transparent.
  - "The Gravity Mine" (2000) – Posthuman beings in the deep future of Manifold: Time struggle in a dying universe.
  - "Spindrift" (1999) – Will human endeavours (e.g. colonisation of the Moon) have any ultimate consequence? Or will humanity arise then vanish unobserved, like spindrift?
  - "Touching Centauri" (2003) – Scientists attempting to use a laser to contact another world inadvertently cause the end of their universe, while everyone struggles with the ultimate nature of their existence. (While snippets of the story are touched upon between each previous story, the full explanation is given here.)
- Dreams (II)
  - "The Twelfth Album" (1998) – Two friends mourning their departed shipmate find a strange Beatles record, leading them to believe that their friend's drunken ravings might have been true.

== See also ==
- Simulated reality
