= Voyage (novel) =

1996 novel by Stephen Baxter

- First edition
- Author: Stephen Baxter
- Cover artist: Chris Moore
- Language: English
- Series: NASA Trilogy
- Genre: Science fiction
- Publisher: Voyager Books (UK)
- Publication date: 21 November 1996
- Publication place: United Kingdom
- Media type: Print (hardback & paperback)
- Pages: 580
- ISBN: 0-00-224616-3
- OCLC: 54247061
- Followed by: Titan

Voyage is a 1996 hard science fiction novel by British author Stephen Baxter. The book depicts a crewed mission to Mars as it might have been in another timeline, one where John F. Kennedy survived the assassination attempt on him on 22 November 1963. Voyage won a Sidewise Award for Alternate History, and was nominated for the Arthur C. Clarke Award in 1997.

In 1999, it was adapted as a radio serial for BBC Radio 4 by Dirk Maggs.

In the novel, John F. Kennedy was crippled in a failed assassination attempt in 1963, while the assassin managed to kill John's wife Jacqueline Kennedy. Still alive during the first Moon landing of 1969, John sets a new goal for the United States to send a crewed mission to Mars and convinces the then-President Richard Nixon to support his plan. Apollo 14 is the last crewed Moon landing in this timeline. Over the following two decades, NASA and contractor personnel devote most of their efforts to planning the exploration of Mars. By 1986, preparations are made for the first crewed landing on Mars. As a negative side-effect from the obsessive focus on Mars, there have been no major efforts to explore the rest of the Solar System and humanity's knowledge of the Outer Solar System has not improved since the 1960s.

== Plot summary ==
The book tells the story in flashbacks during the actual Mars mission of the chronicalised history until the mission's beginning. The point of divergence for this alternate timeline happens on 22 November 1963, where John F. Kennedy survived the assassination (Jacqueline Kennedy was killed, hence the renaming of the Kennedy Space Center as the Jacqueline B. Kennedy Space Center), but was crippled and thus incapacitated, as Lyndon B. Johnson is still sworn in. On 20 July 1969, Apollo 11 astronauts Neil Armstrong and Joe Muldoon walk on the Moon, and Richard Nixon's "most historic phone call" is joined by a call from former President Kennedy, committing the United States to send a crewed mission to Mars, which Nixon backs as part of his fateful decision to decide the future of crewed spaceflight, instead of deciding on the Space Shuttle program as he did in our timeline.

Preparations for this new goal include slashing the number of Moon landings so funding and leftover Apollo spacecraft hardware can go towards the efforts of the crewed Mars mission. Apollo 12 still lands, Apollo 13 still suffers its disaster, but Apollo 14 is crewed by the astronauts of the cancelled Apollo 15 mission to carry out the scientific experiments on the lunar surface, and is the last crewed Moon landing. At the same time, the NERVA program is revived to become the chosen Mars spacecraft development, with larger tests in Nevada, but without containment and plagued with engineering problems.

The book centres around chronicling the lives of the future Mars mission astronauts, NASA and contractor personnel all involved in making the mission become a reality, and the shifts within NASA's astronaut and management hierarchy throughout the mission's preparations, including female geologist Natalie York's quest to become an astronaut, and her stormy relationships with fellow astronaut Ben Priest and NERVA engineer Mike Conlig. Other astronauts include Ralph Gershon, a former fighter-bomber pilot involved in illegal bombing missions in Cambodia during the Vietnam War whose dream is to be the first black man in space, and Phil Stone, a veteran Air Force test pilot-turned-astronaut who has flown in a long-term stay on a lunar orbital station before the Mars mission.

In the 1970s, the Skylab Space Station is launched, but apparently as a wet workshop design that is based on the Saturn IB S-IVB upper stage called Skylab A. The Saturn V that might have launched Skylab in our timeline instead launches Skylab B, a lunar orbit space station unofficially named "Moonlab", also a wet workshop based on the S-IVB. The Apollo-Soyuz Test Project is instead a series of visits by the Apollo Command/Service Module to Salyut space stations, and Soyuz missions to both Skylab and Moonlab. To facilitate the latter, the Soviets finally finish work on their N-1. The Skylab/Moonlab programs lead to improvements in the design of the Apollo Command/Service Module. A Block III CSM is produced using battery power in place of fuel cells, followed by the Block IV and V, which have a degree of reusability (modular construction and resistance to salt water corrosion). Also chronicled is the development of the experimental 'Mars Excursion Module' by small aerospace firm Columbia Aviation as it struggles against larger rival contractors of NASA and its engineers working painstakingly against the technical challenges of a working and reliable Mars lander.

A test of the NERVA, called Apollo-N, is finally launched atop the modified Saturn VN, but suffers from pogo oscillations in the S-IC first stage. This damages the NERVA upper stage, which catastrophically fails once fired in orbit; despite returning to Earth safely, the entire crew (including Ben Priest) is killed by radiation poisoning, and the space program nearly collapses from hostile political and public opinion against the use of nuclear power in space, and the seemingly unnecessary risks and reasons of a Mars mission.

In the aftermath, a new Mars mission plan dubbed Ares is drawn up, utilising the upgraded Saturn V-B, which has numerous improvements, including the use of solid rocket boosters to double its payload. Ares also uses on-orbit assembly of a different long duration Mars-ship using wet-workshop Saturn rocket components as the propulsion systems as well as a Skylab habitat module and external tanks to hold extra fuel. Ares performs a Venus flyby reminiscent of the Manned Venus Flyby NASA planned in the aftermath of the original Apollo program, but done in this timeline for gravitational assistance, and finally lands at Mangala Valles on 27 March 1986.

However, as a side effect, a number of uncrewed probes – including the Viking program, Pioneer Venus project, Mariner 10, Pioneers 10 and 11, and the Voyager program – are cancelled so that their funding can be redirected to the crewed Mars mission, although another Mariner orbiter is sent to Mars to help prepare for the crewed landing. As a result, although humans walk on Mars, their knowledge of the Solar System, including Mars itself and especially the outer Solar System planets which never get visited without the Pioneer/Voyager missions, is far less than in reality.

== Characters ==
- Natalie York. An intelligent but cynical female geologist training to become the first American female astronaut (almost parallel to Sally Ride, but she is never mentioned in the book). 'Ares' Mission Specialist. She seemingly acts as the book's protagonist and a characterised incarnation of Baxter's views of NASA and humanity's destiny in space, an all-knowing archetype character used predominantly in Baxter's other novels.
- Phil Stone. A former male US Air Force test pilot who in this timeline, was the last to fly the X-15 rocket plane and the first pilot to ever recover from a supersonic spin. He becomes an astronaut following the Moon landings to fly the Apollo/Moonlab missions. 'Ares' Mars Mission Commander.
- Ralph Gershon. An African-American male US Air Force pilot once involved in illegal CIA operations in Cambodia during the Vietnam War and joins NASA afterward to help develop the first Mars lander. 'Ares' MEM (Mars Excursion Module) Pilot.
- Ben Priest. York's love interest and fellow male astronaut, flight engineer/LEM-less pilot of the doomed Apollo-N mission.
- Gregory Dana. Male aerospace engineer and Nazi death-camp survivor, responsible for the redevelopment of the Mars Mission profile.
- JK Lee. Male Director and Chief Engineer of Columbia Aviation, responsible for building the MEM and very dedicated (if not obsessed) to the task.
- Mike Conlig. In charge of developing the NERVA engine, and York's estranged boyfriend.
- Hans Udet. Male NASA director of the Mars project and a big supporter of NERVA, and former Nazi rocket scientist. Gregory Dana despises him for being the man in charge of the Mittelwerk where Dana was used as slave labor. Udet is a parallel of Arthur Rudolph.
- Bert Seger. Male NASA manager who worked for both Fred Michaels and Joe Muldoon.
- Joe Muldoon. The second man on the Moon (a parallel of Edwin "Buzz" Aldrin) and a prominent figurehead and manager in the development of the Mars mission.
- Chuck Jones. A surly male astronaut (a parallel of Wally Schirra and Malcolm Scott Carpenter) who was the second American to orbit the Earth, Phil Stone's fellow Moonlab veteran, and commander of the doomed Apollo-N mission.
- Fred Michaels. Male NASA Administrator from 1969 to 1981, a parallel of James E. Webb.
- Jim Dana. Male astronaut, son of Gregory Dana, Command Module Pilot of the doomed Apollo-N.
- Adam Bleeker. Male astronaut and geologist-in-training, Moonlab veteran and contender for the position of 'Ares' Mission Specialist along with Natalie York, but taken off flight status due to concerns about cumulative radiation exposure from long duration space missions.
- Vladimir Viktorenko. Male Soviet cosmonaut, Apollo/Soyuz/Moonlab veteran, and friend of Joe Muldoon and Natalie York.

== Spinoffs ==
The allohistorical setting of the novel was further explored in the short story "Prospero One", in which Baxter focuses on alternate developments in the 1960s British space programme – namely, its first and only crewed flight. The short story was originally published in issue 112 of Interzone, in October 1996. It featured two astronauts being launched on a set of five Blue Streak missiles.

The character Joe Muldoon is featured in Baxter's 2018 short story "The Shadow Over the Moon," where he is explicitly stated as being the Apollo 11 backup for Buzz Aldrin.
