= Apollo Telescope Mount =

Solar observatory on Skylab

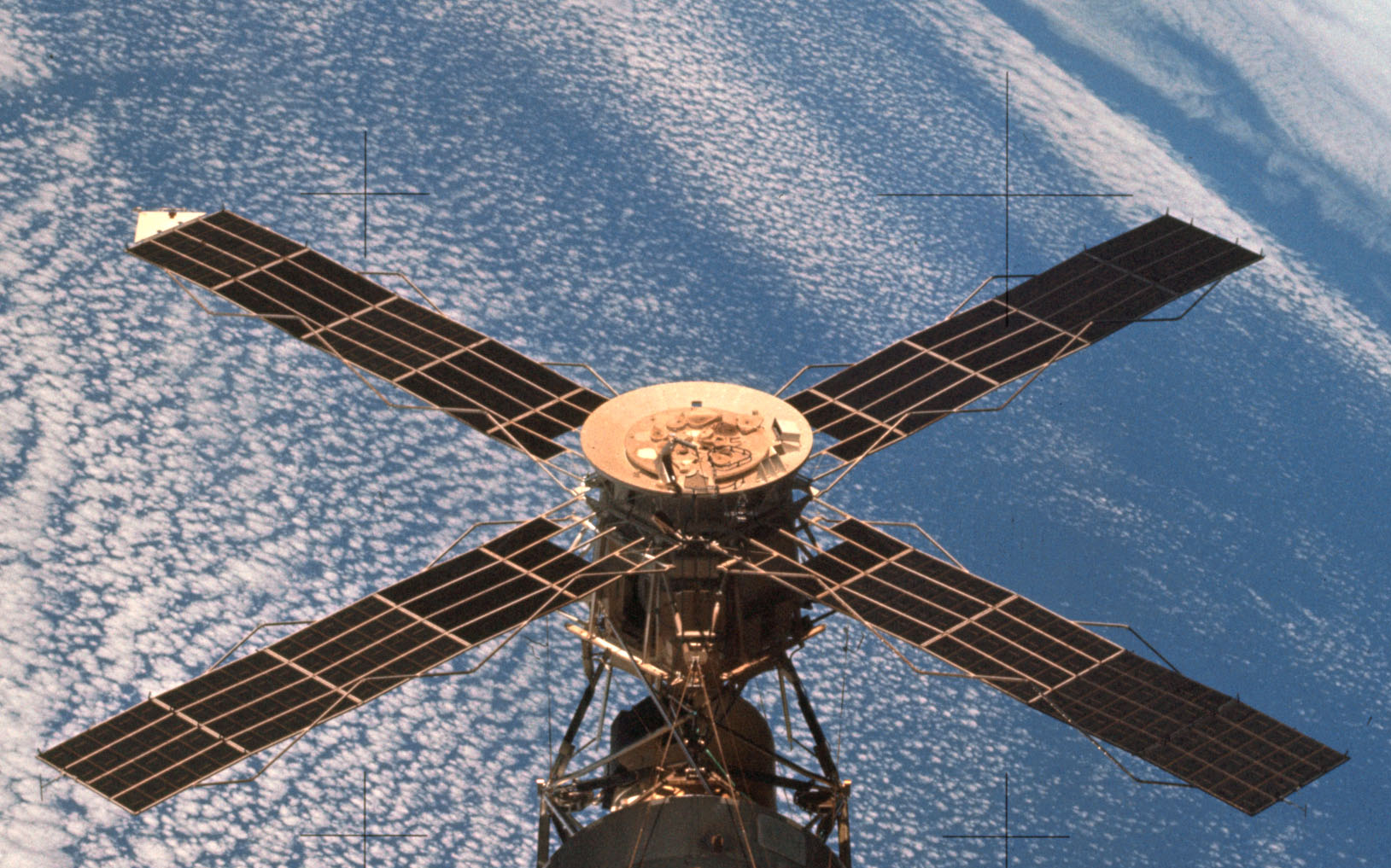
- Image of the ATM with solar panels extending
- Related media on Commons

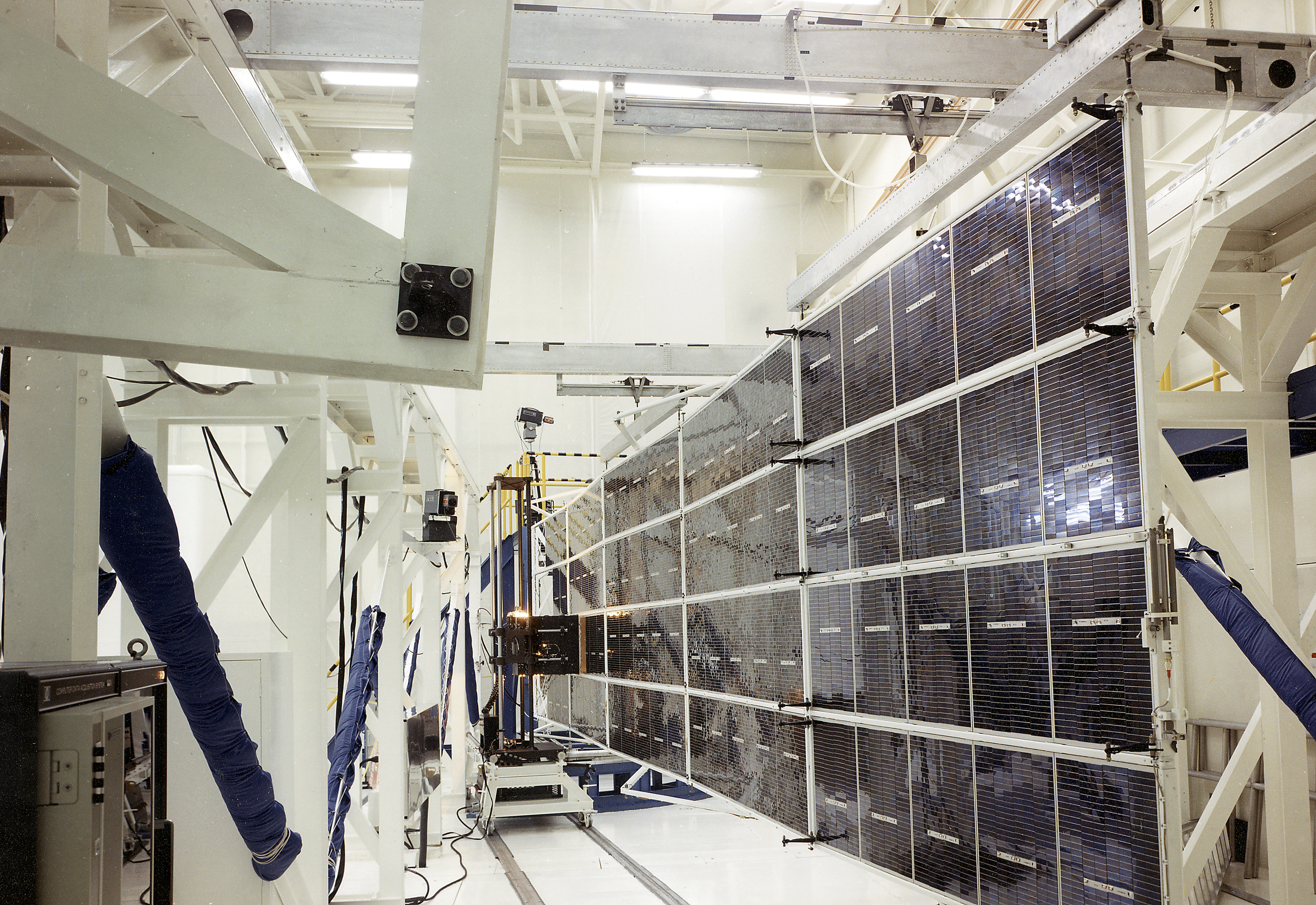
Solar array for the ATM (could also power other Skylab systems)

The Apollo Telescope Mount, or ATM, was a crewed solar observatory that was a part of Skylab, the first American space station. It could observe the Sun in wavelengths ranging from soft X-rays, ultraviolet, and visible light.

The ATM was manually operated by the astronauts aboard Skylab from 1973–74, yielding data principally as exposed photographic film that was returned to Earth with the crew. The film magazines had to be changed out by the crew during spacewalks, although some instruments had a live video feed that could be observed from inside the space station. Some of the first Polaroid photos (an instant film-to-hard copy camera) in space were taken of a Skylab CRT video screen displaying the Sun as recorded by an ATM instrument. Although the ATM was integrated with the Skylab station, it started as a separate project related to use of the Apollo spacecraft, which is why it has the name Apollo in it rather than Skylab; the Skylab station was visited by astronauts using the Apollo spacecraft launched by the Saturn IB, and the Station with its solar observatory was launched by a Saturn V.

The ATM was designed and construction was managed at NASA's Marshall Space Flight Center. It included eight major observational instruments, along with several lesser experiments.

ATM was integrated with the Skylab space station, which was used to point the observatory. Likewise, Skylab used power from the ATM solar arrays.

As of 2006, the original exposures were on file (and accessible to interested parties) at the Naval Research Laboratory in Washington, D.C.

== Design ==
The ATM was actively cooled to maintain the temperature of the instruments within a certain range. Pointing was done with the help of the Skylab computer, which could be commanded from the space station by astronauts or by communication link from Earth. The four external mounted solar panels deploy in an 'X' shape, and provide around 30% of the station's electrical power.

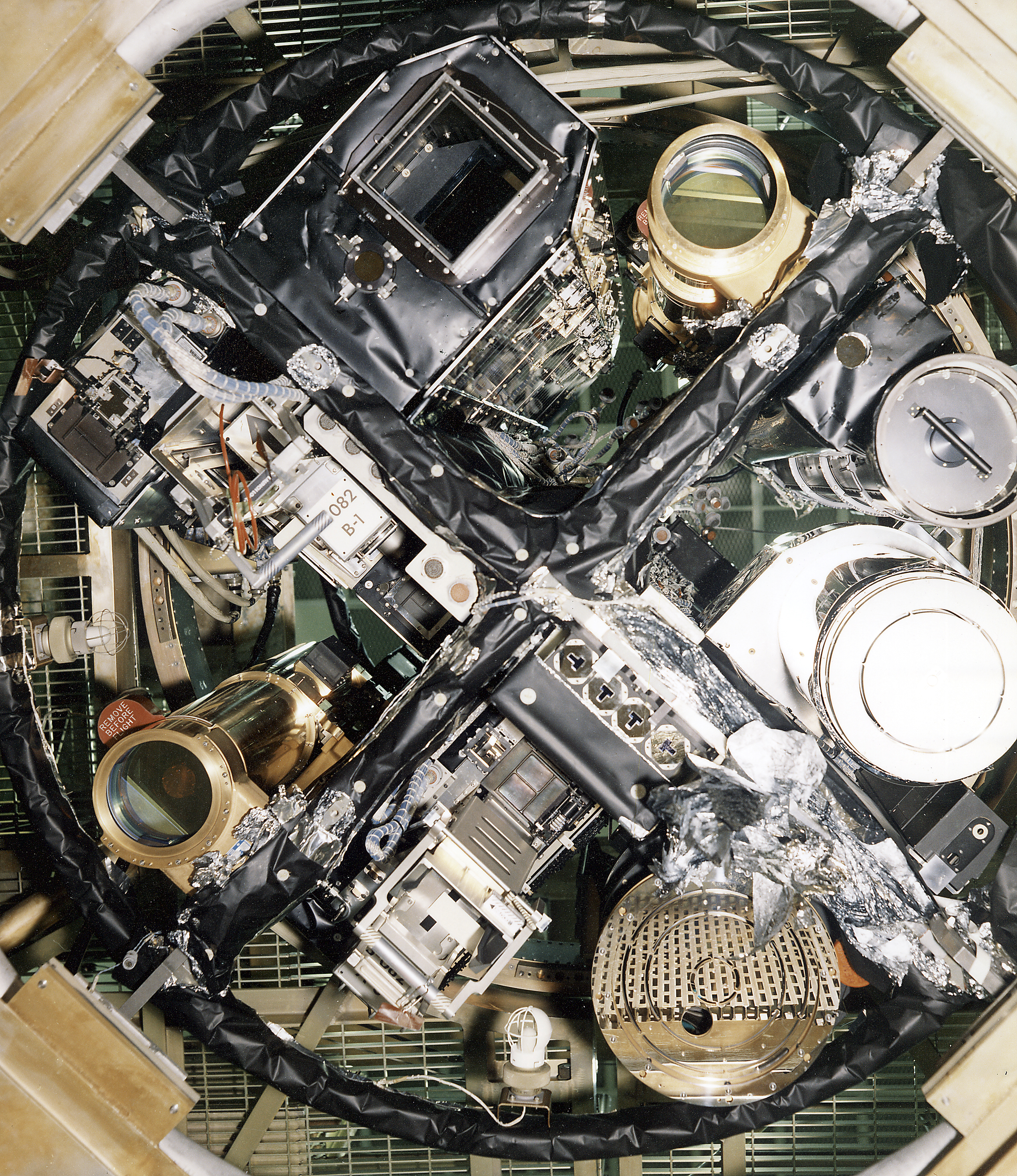
Sun facing end showing the instrumentation apertures

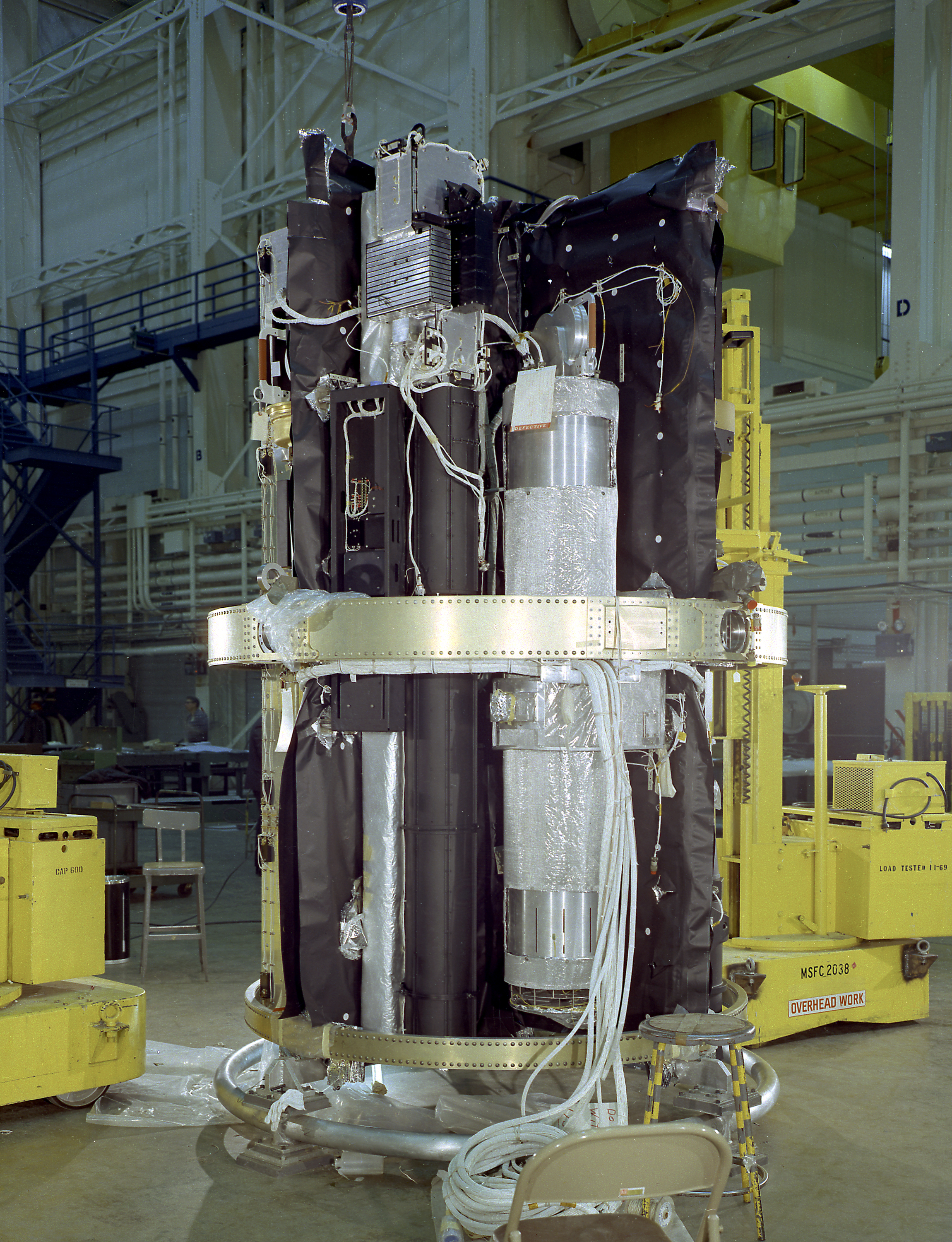
A side view of the instrument cluster without its enclosure

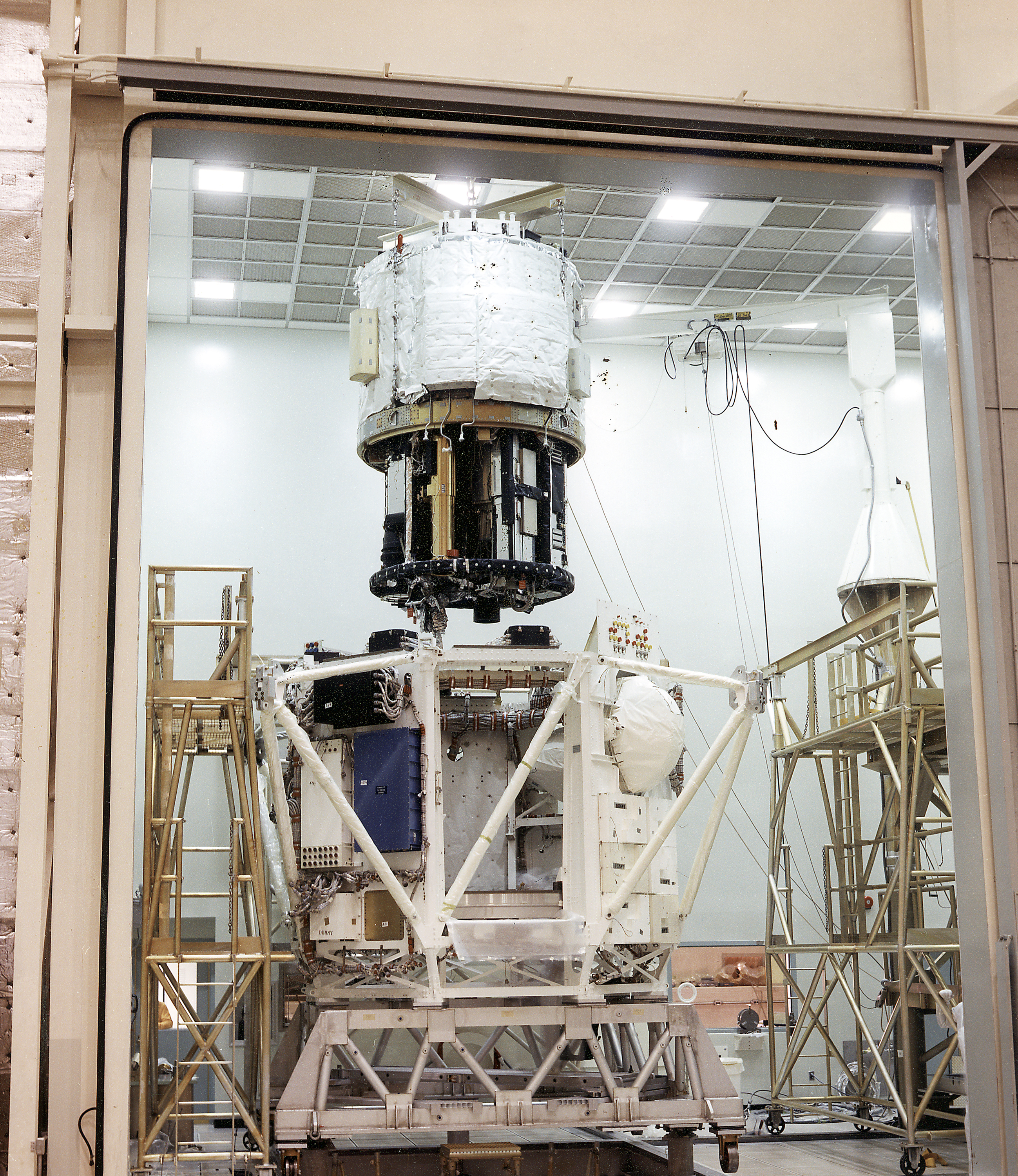
ATM assembly

== History ==
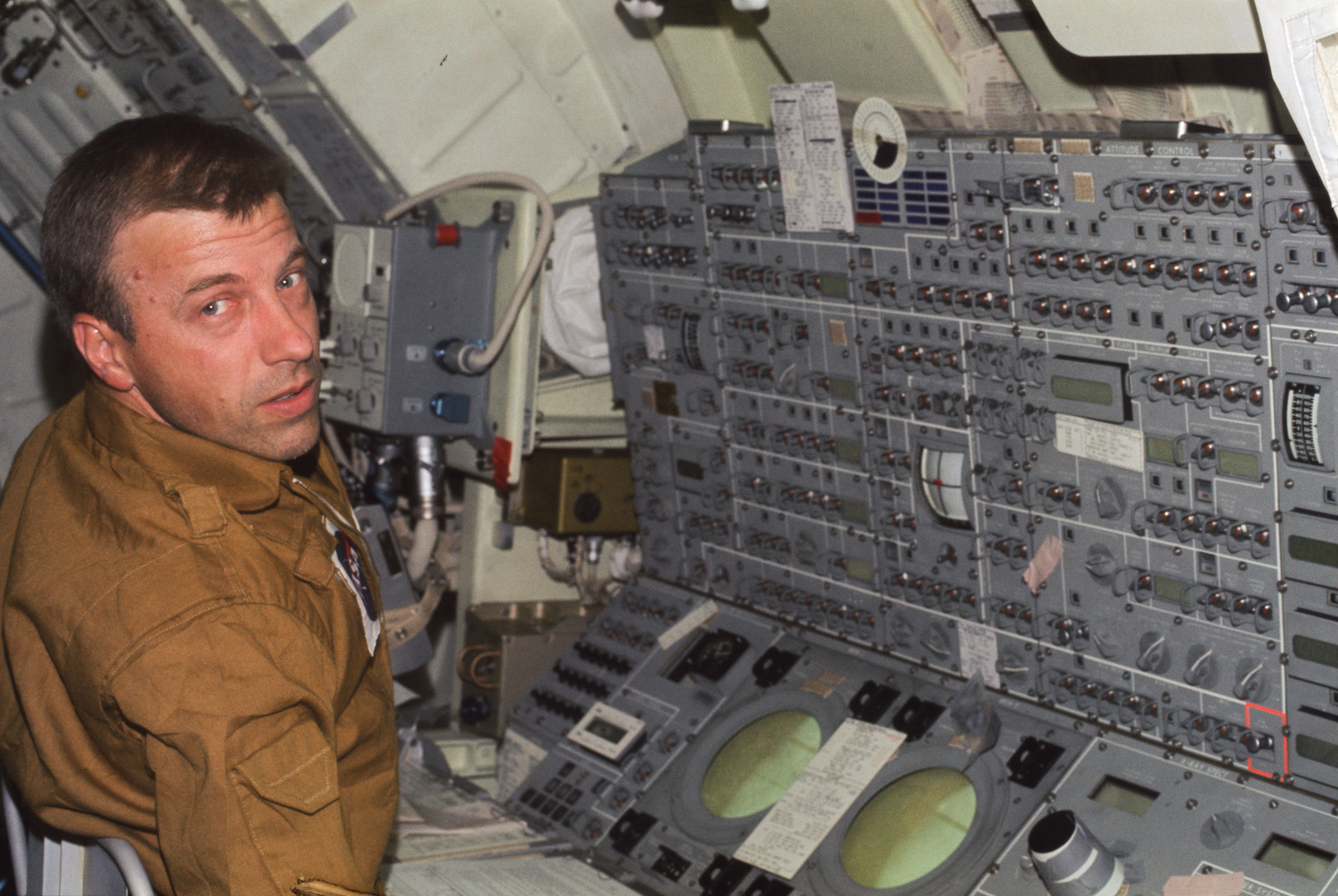
Astronaut Paul J. Weitz at the telescope's command and display (C&D) console inside Skylab during the mission (June 1973)

The ATM was one of the projects that came out of the late 1960s Apollo Applications Program, which studied a wide variety of ways to use the infrastructure developed for the Apollo program in the 1970s. Among these concepts were various extended-stay lunar missions, a permanent lunar base, long-duration space missions, a number of large observatories, and eventually the "wet workshop" space station.

In the case of the ATM, the initial idea was to mount the instrumentation in a deployable unit attached to the Service Module, this was then changed to use a modified Apollo Lunar Module to house controls, observation instruments and recording systems, while the lunar descent stage was replaced with a large solar telescope and solar panels to power it all. After launch, it would be met in orbit by a three-crew Apollo CSM who would operate it and retrieve data before returning to Earth. As many of the other concepts were dropped, eventually only the space station and ATM remained "on the books". The plans then changed to launch the ATM and have it connect to Skylab in orbit. Both spacecraft would then be operated by the Skylab crews.

With the cancellation of the later Apollo landing missions providing a Saturn V, the wet workshop concept was no longer needed. Instead, the plans were changed to orbit an expanded, dry version of the station. The ATM would now be launched attached to the station, as the Saturn V had enough power to launch them both at the same time. This change saved the Skylab program when a problem during launch destroyed one of the workshop solar panels and prevented the other from automatically deploying. The windmill-like arrays on the ATM, which fed power to both the ATM and the station, remained undamaged due to the protection within the launch shroud, and provided enough power for crewed operations until the one remaining workshop array could be deployed during the first crewed mission.

There were additional astronomical and Earth observation experiments aboard Skylab. During development, the ATM was subjected to thermal vacuum testing.

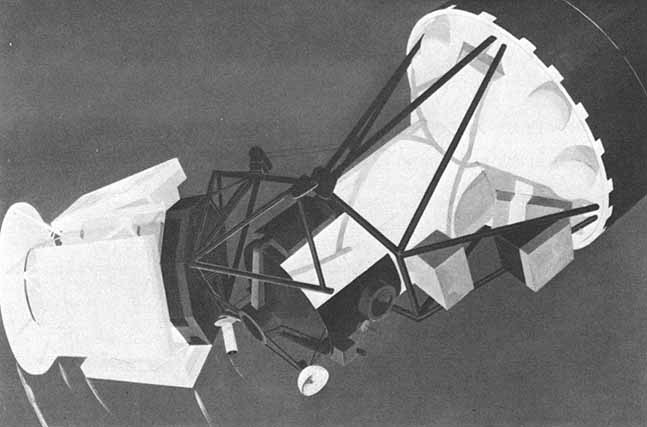
Illustration of the telescope cluster and solar array deployment

== Instruments ==
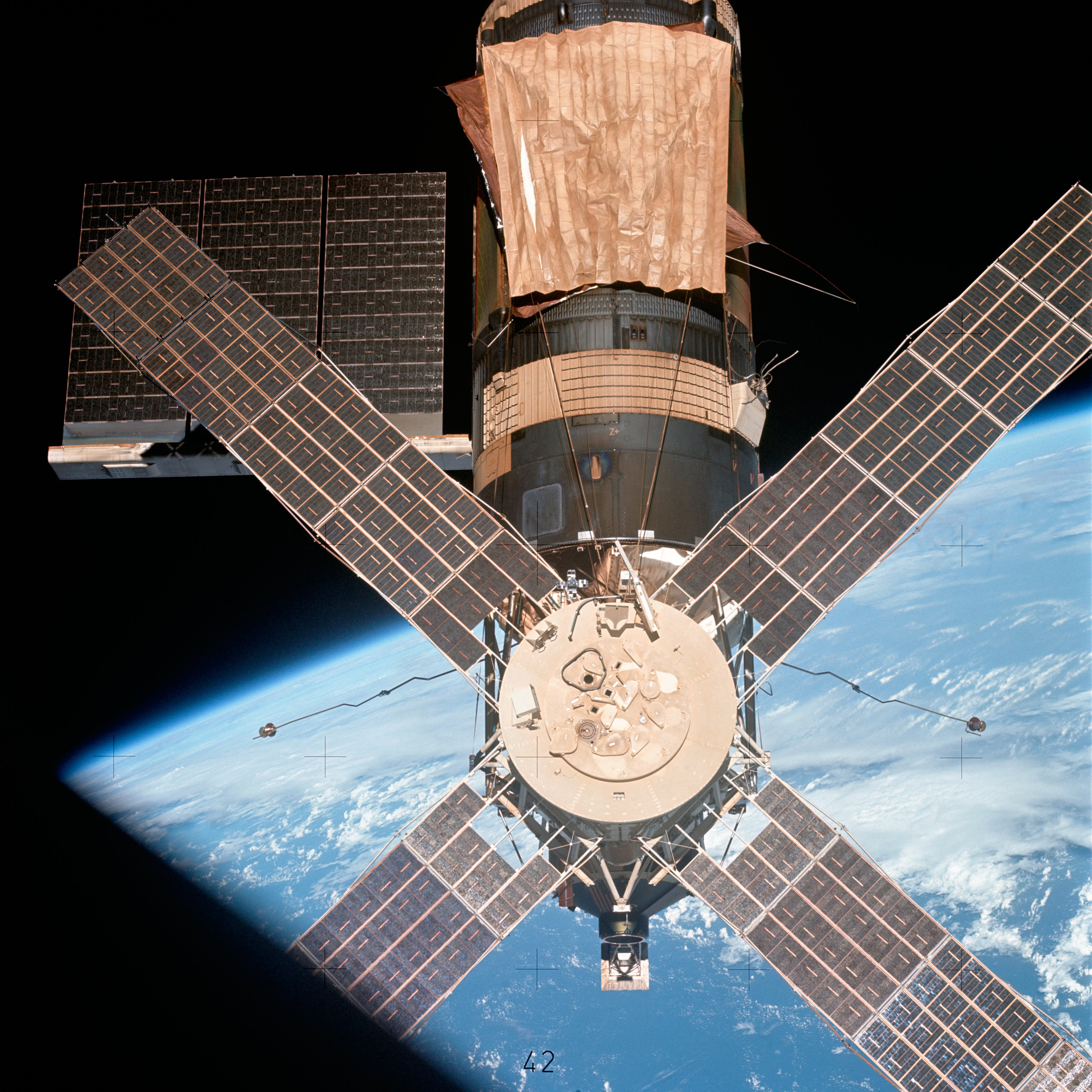
Image of the ATM taken showing some of the instrument covers

There were 8 major solar studies instruments on the mount. Combined, they could observe the Sun in light wavelengths from 2 to 7000 Å (angstroms), which corresponds to soft X-ray, ultraviolet, and visible light.

- two X-ray telescopes
- extreme ultraviolet spectroheliograph
- ultraviolet spectroheliometer
- ultraviolet spectrograph
- visible light coronagraph
- two Hydrogen Alpha telescopes

Same instruments by designation:

The X-Ray instruments included:

- S-054
- S-056
- S-020 (X-ray and extreme ultraviolet camera)

UV instruments included:

- S-082A (Extreme ultraviolet spectroheliograph)
- S-082B (Ultraviolet spectroheliometer)
- S-055 (Ultraviolet spectrograph)

Hydrogen alpha and coronograph:

- H-alpha no. 1
- H-alpha no. 2
- S-052 (a Coronagraph)

Also, experiment S149 was attached to one of the ATM solar panels.

== Film canisters ==
Six ATM experiments used film to record data, and over the course of the missions over 150,000 successful exposures were recorded. The film canister had to be manually retrieved on crewed spacewalks to the instruments during the missions. The film canisters were returned to Earth aboard the Apollo capsules when each mission ended, and were among the heaviest items that had to be returned at the end of each mission. The heaviest canisters weighed 40 kg (88.1 lb) and could hold up to 16,000 frames of film.

Over the course of operations almost 30 canisters were loaded and utilized, and then returned to Earth.

== Results ==
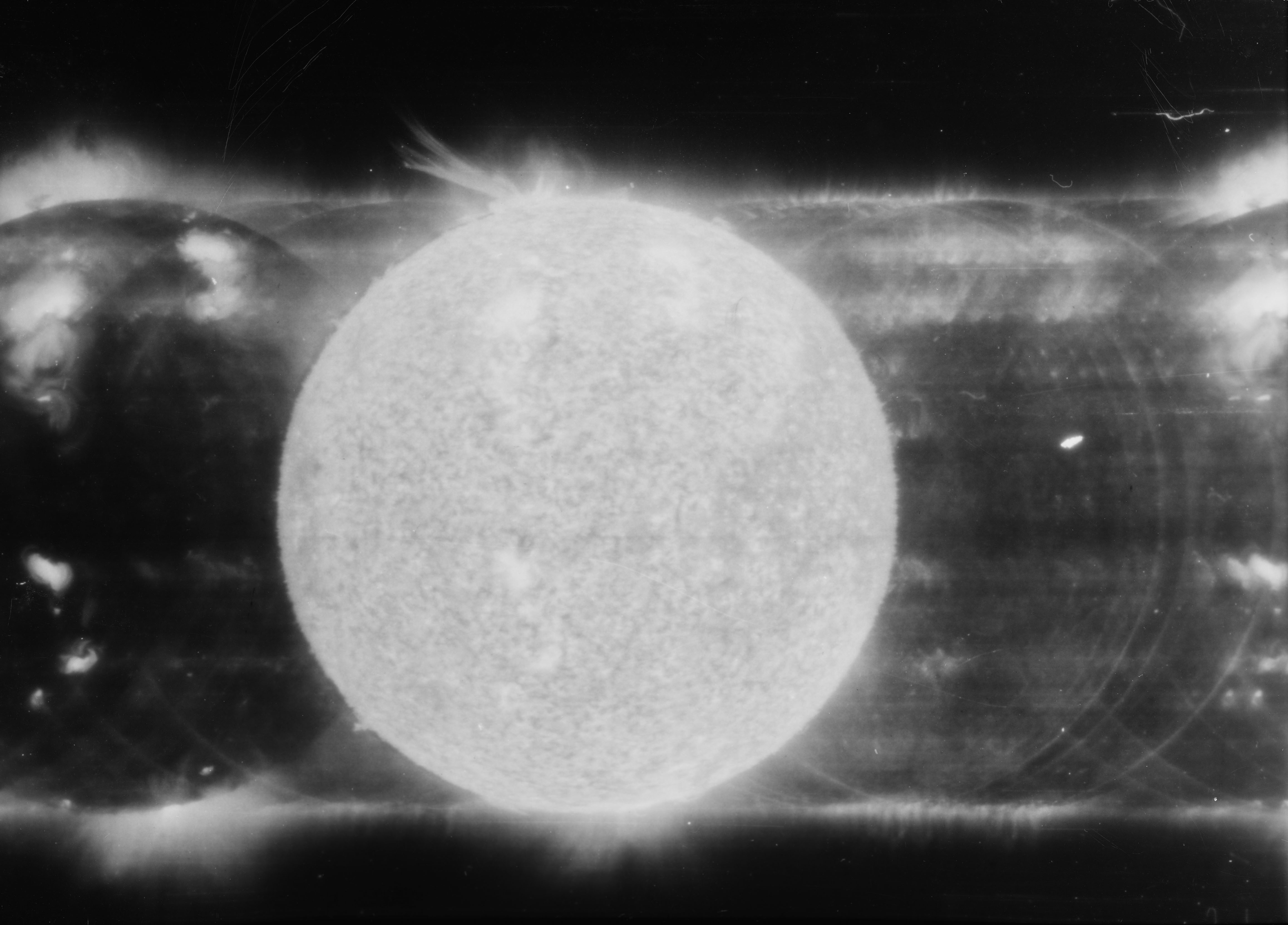
Solar eruption seen in this spectroheliograph covering the wavelength region from 150 to 650 angstroms (Skylab 2, June 10, 1973)

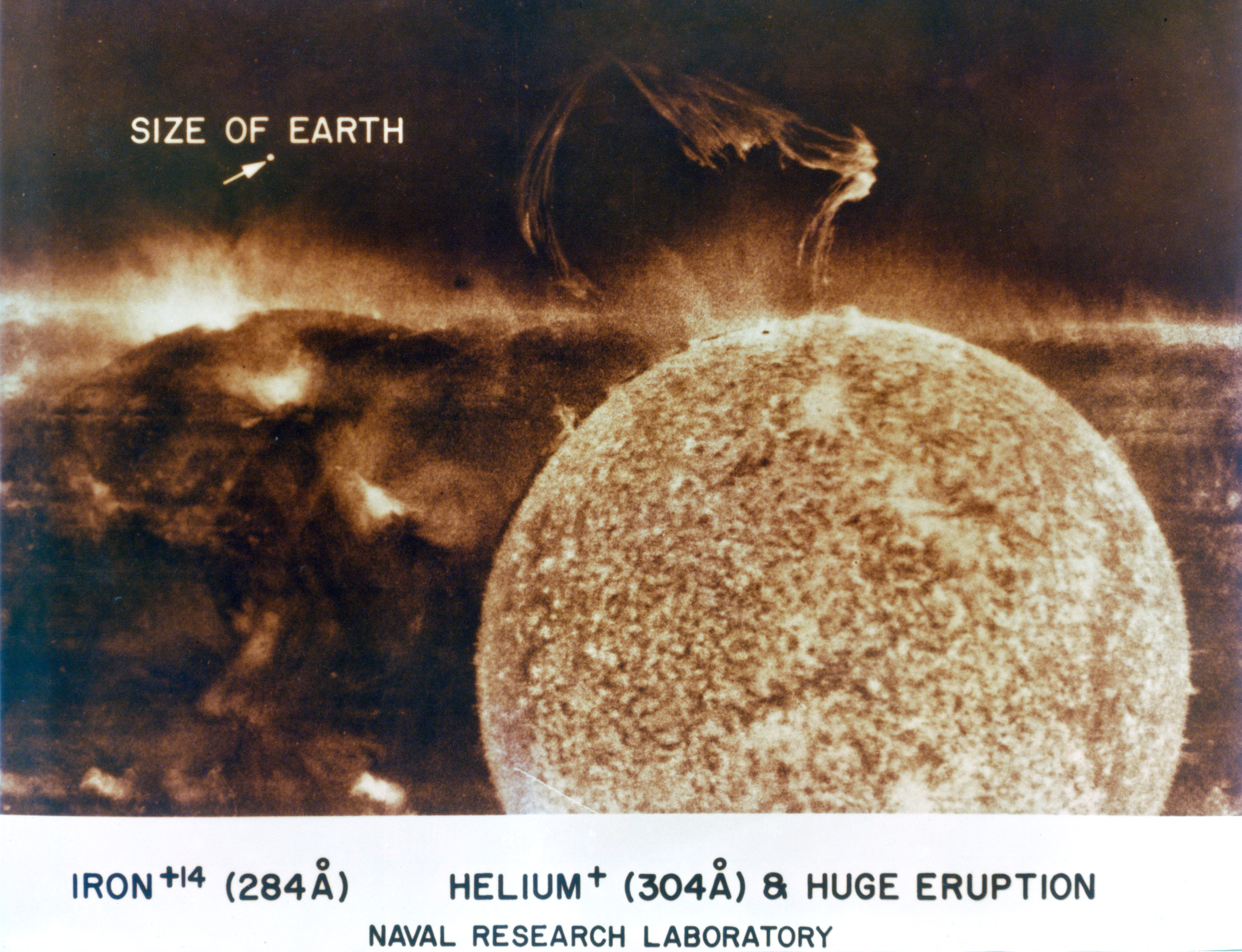
Extreme ultraviolet image of the Sun with the Earth added for scale (Skylab 3, July 1973)

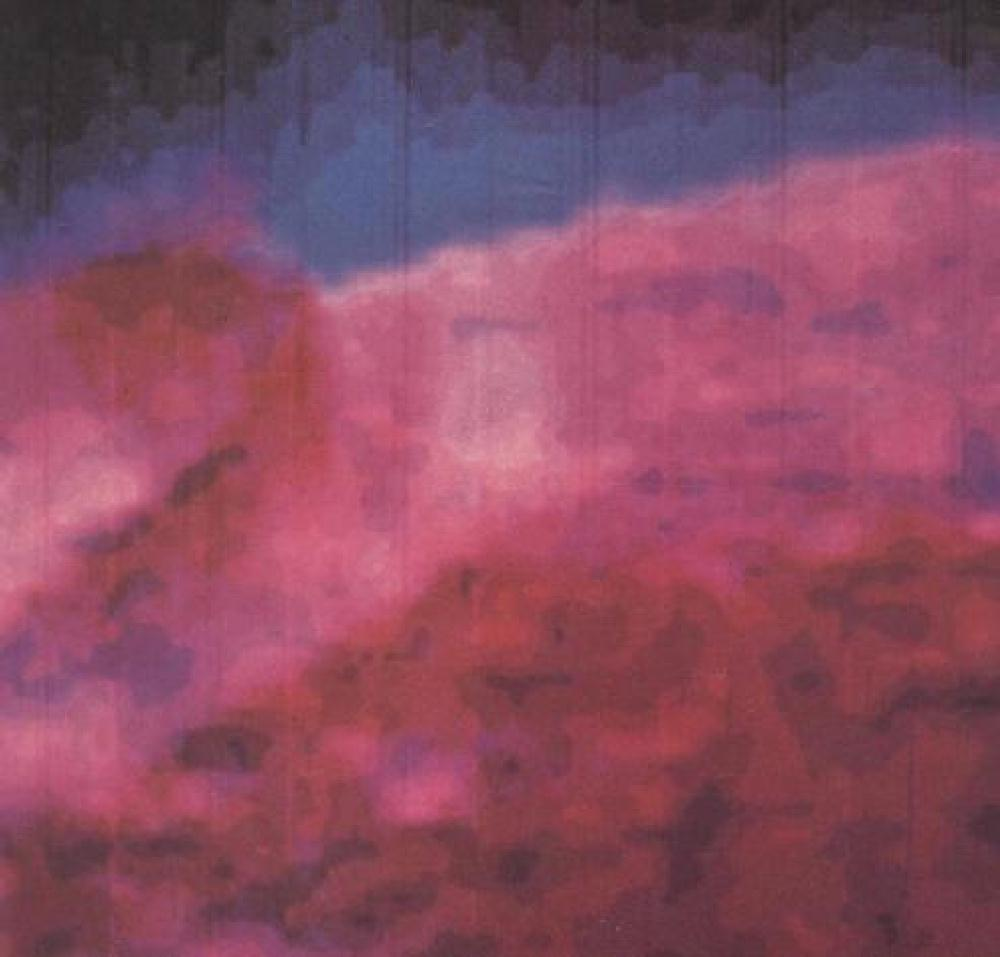
A hiding, troutlike prominence is exposed when the blue coronal view is combined with a red-coded ultraviolet picture that samples cooler chromospheric temperatures. (Skylab 3, July 1973)

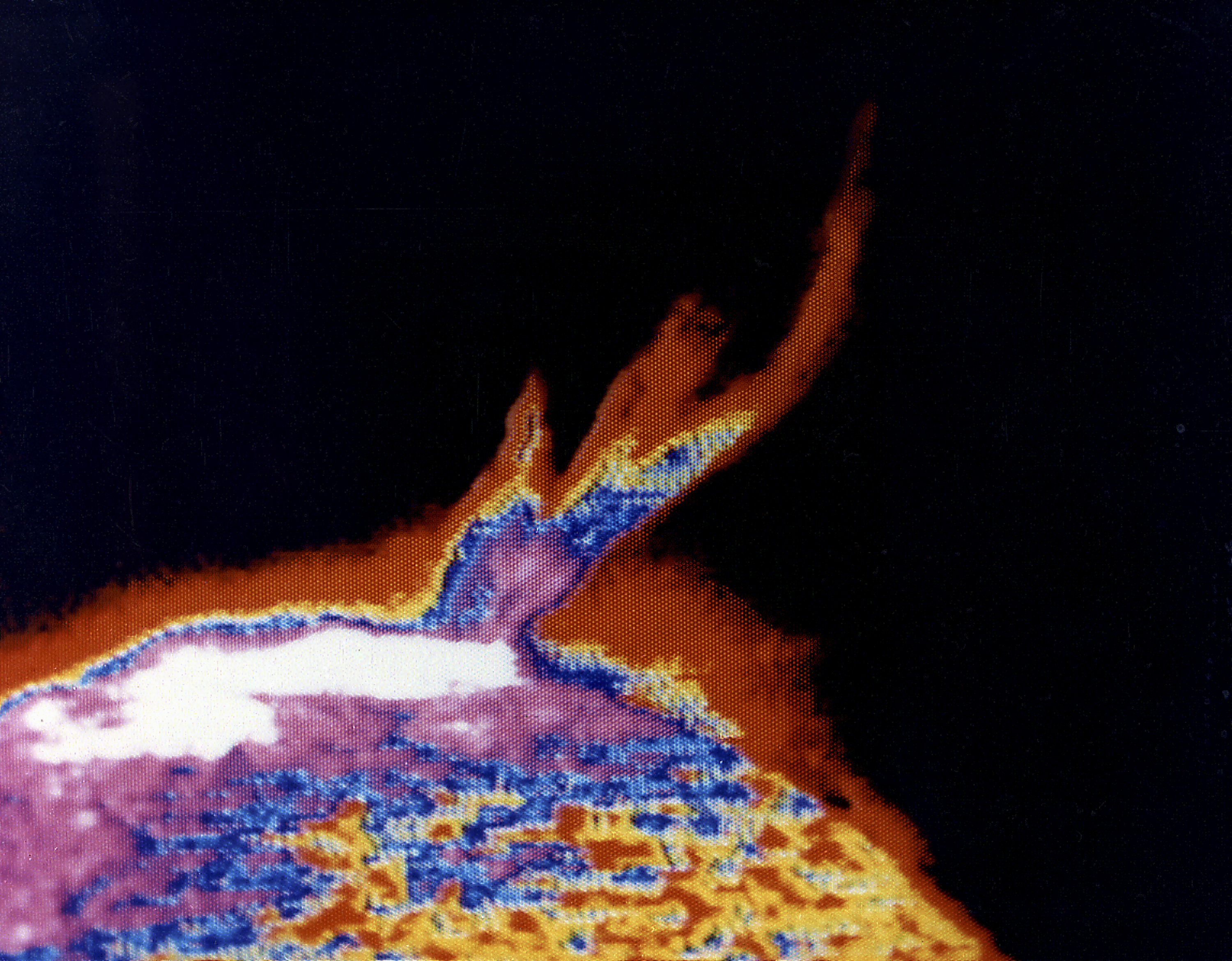
False color image of a solar prominence (Skylab 3, August 21, 1973)

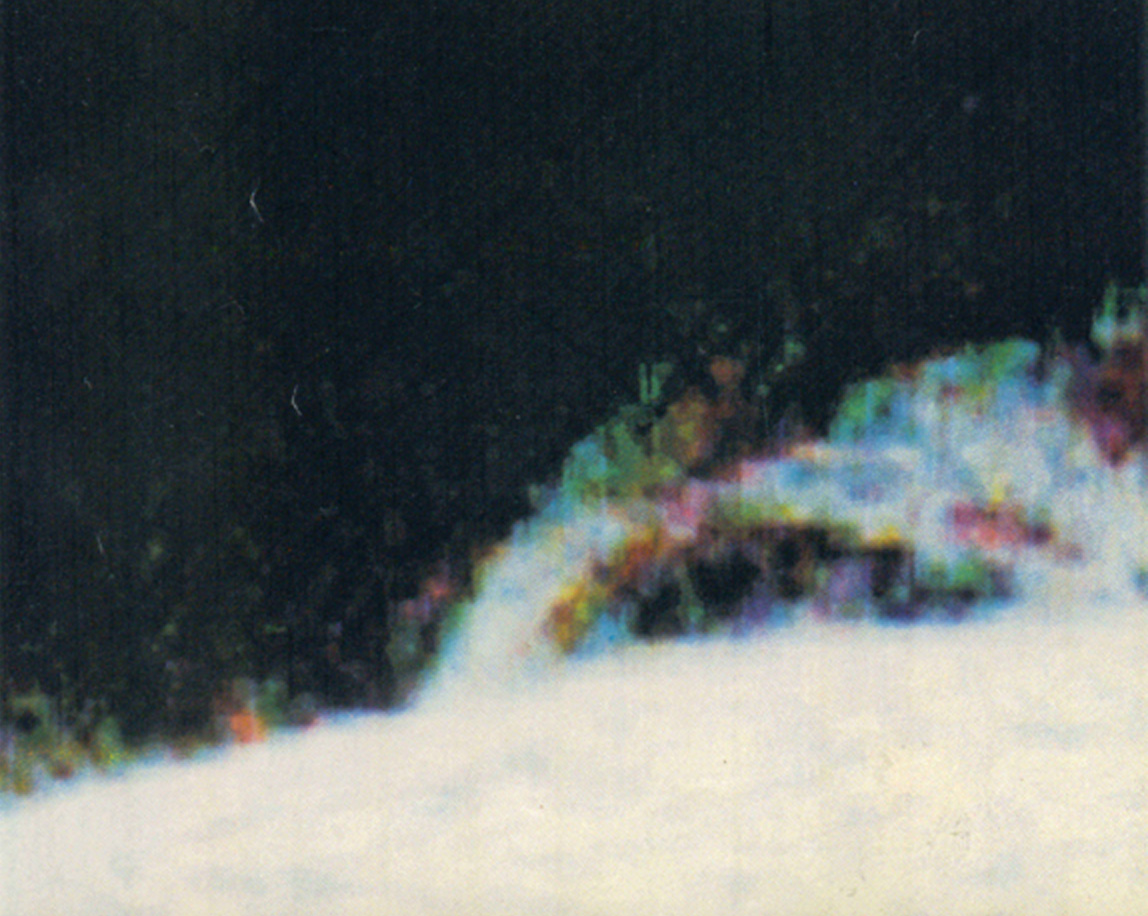
Color processed ultraviolet image differentiating changes in a wispy prominence arch (Skylab 4, 14 December 1973)

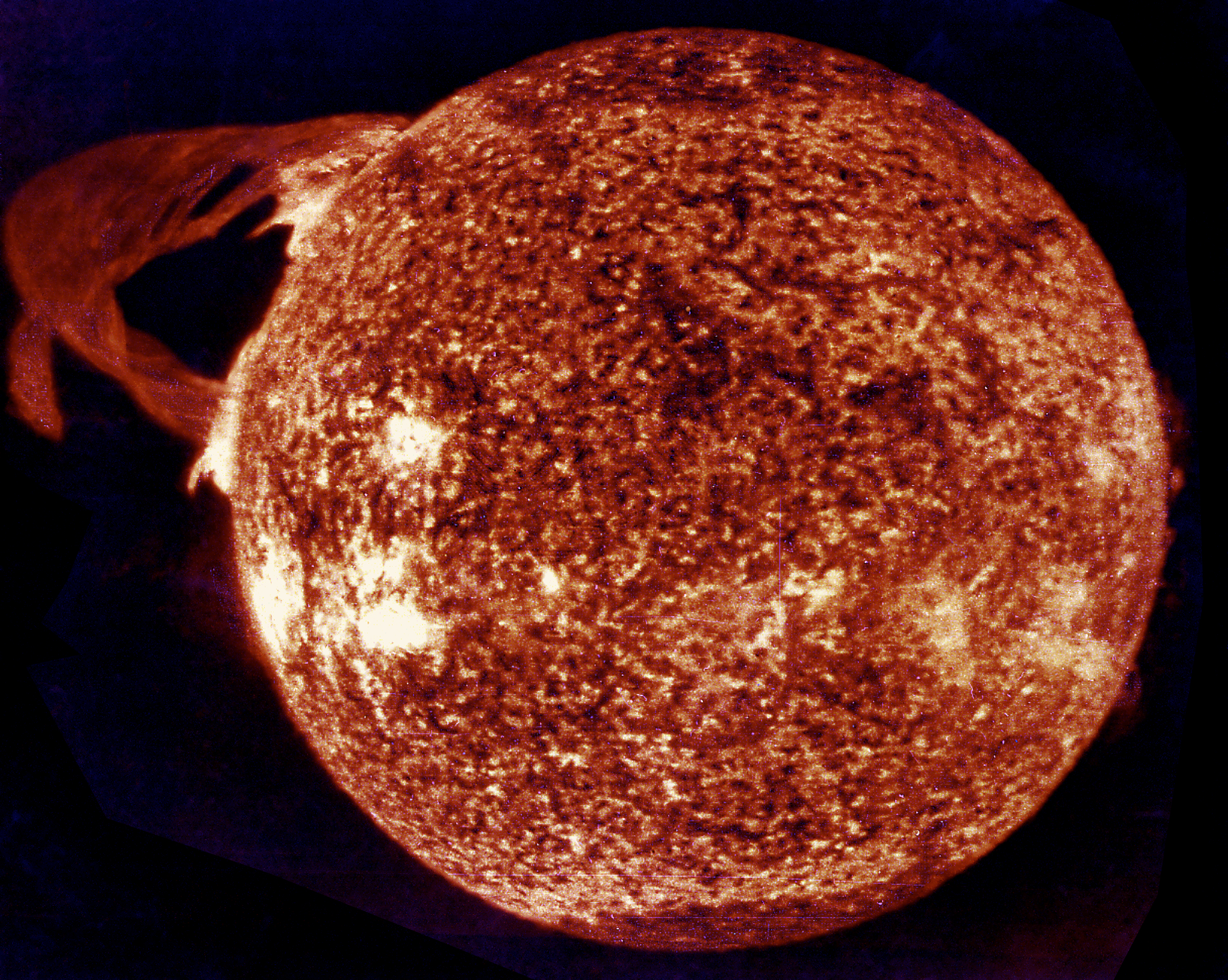
Ultraviolet image of a colossal eruption (Skylab 4, December 19, 1973).

== Experiments ==
The instruments were used for various types of observations including pre-planned experiments, including a set of student experiments. This is a chart describing an example of this:

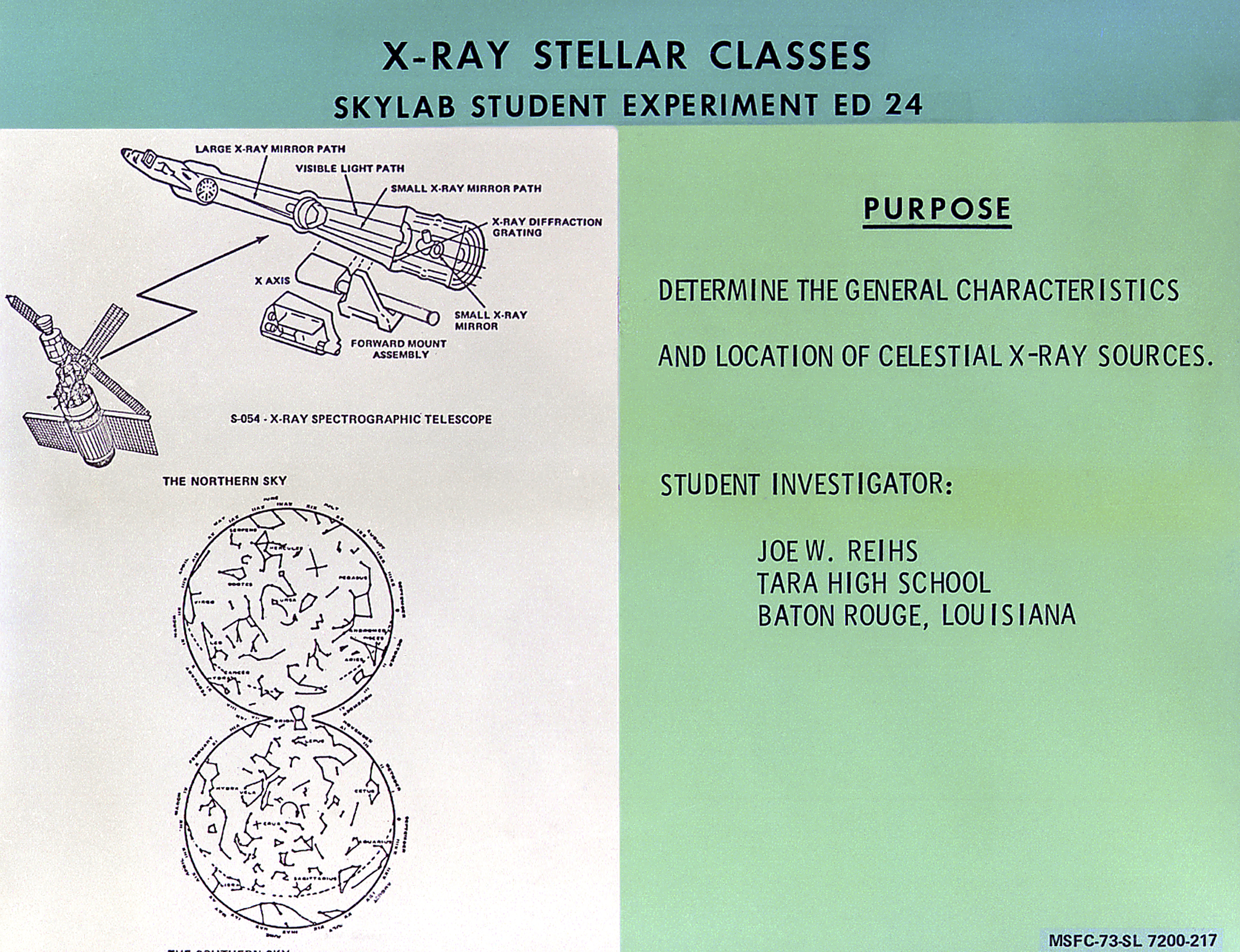
Chart for the ED 24 experiment

== S-54 X-Ray Spectrographic Telescope ==
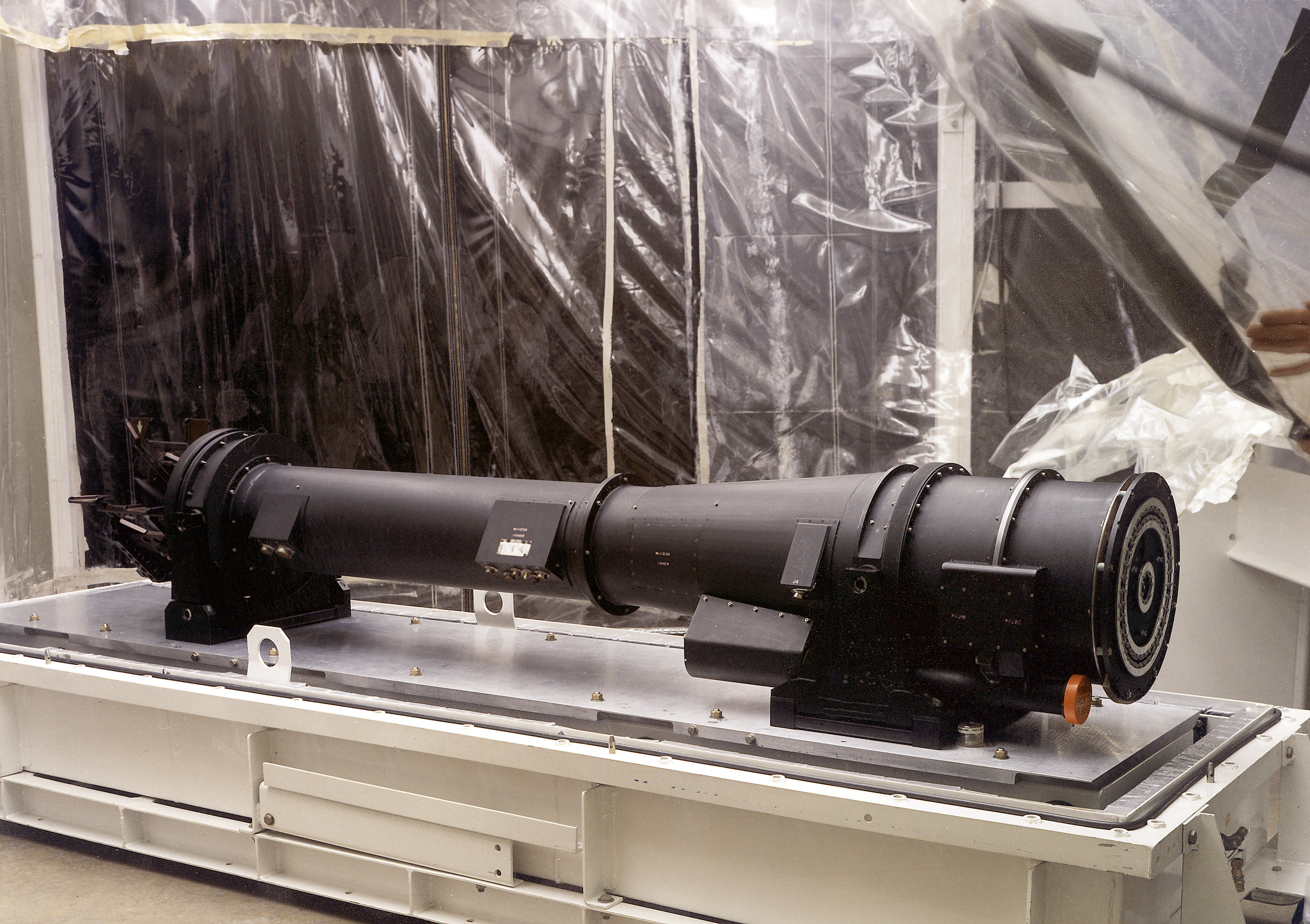
Skylab S-54 instrument, 1970

== Legacy ==
A backup ATM spare (instruments were mounted to this) was restored and put on display in 2015 at the Steven F. Udvar-Hazy Center in Chantilly, Virginia, US. The restoration involved repairing some Kapton layers that had degraded after 4 decades.

== See also ==
- Orbiting Solar Observatory
- List of X-ray space telescopes
- List of spacewalks and moonwalks 1965–1999 (in the early 1970s several Skylab spacewalks including servicing ATM)
