= Moonseed =

Moonseed may refer to:

- Cocculus, a genus of woody vines and shrubs with the common name moonseed
- Menispermum, a genus of deciduous climbing woody vines with the common name moonseed
- Moonseed (novel), a 1998 science fiction novel by Stephen Baxter
