= Apollo Applications Program =

American human spaceflight program

The Apollo Applications Program (AAP) was created as early as 1966 by NASA headquarters to develop science-based human spaceflight missions using hardware developed for the Apollo program. AAP was the ultimate development of a number of official and unofficial Apollo follow-on projects studied at various NASA labs. However, the AAP's ambitious initial plans became an early casualty when the Johnson Administration declined to support it fully in order to remain within a $100 billion budget. Thus, Fiscal Year 1967 ultimately allocated $80 million to the AAP, compared to NASA's preliminary estimates of $450 million necessary to fund a full-scale AAP program for that year, with over $1 billion being required for FY 1968. The AAP eventually led to Skylab, which absorbed much of what had been developed under Apollo Applications.

== Origins ==
NASA management was concerned about losing the 400,000 workers involved in Apollo after landing on the Moon in 1969. Wernher von Braun, head of NASA's Marshall Space Flight Center during the 1960s, advocated for a smaller space station (after his large one was not built) to provide his employees with work beyond developing the Saturn rockets, which would be completed relatively early during Project Apollo. NASA originally set up the Apollo Logistic Support System Office to study various ways to modify the Apollo hardware for scientific missions. The AAP office was initially an offshoot of the Apollo "X" bureau, also known as the Apollo Extension Series. AES was developing technology concepts for proposed missions based on the Saturn IB and Saturn V boosters. These included a crewed lunar base, an Earth-orbiting space station, the so-called Grand Tour of the Outer Solar System, and the original Voyager program of Mars Lander probes.

=== AES (Apollo Extension Series) Lunar Base ===
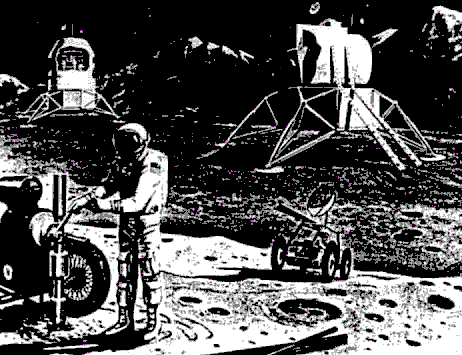
Apollo Extension Systems Lunar Base concept

The Apollo lunar base proposal saw an uncrewed Saturn V used to land a shelter based on the Apollo Command/Service Module (CSM) on the Moon. A second Saturn V would carry a three-person crew and a modified CSM and Apollo Lunar Module (LM) to the Moon. The two-person excursion team would have a surface stay time of nearly 200 days and use of an advanced lunar rover and a lunar flier as well as logistics vehicles to construct a larger shelter. The isolation of the CSM pilot was a concern for mission planners, so proposals that it would be a three-person landing team or that the CSM would rendezvous with an orbiting module were considered.

==== Evolution ====
The following phases were considered:

- Phase 1: 1969-1971: This "Apollo Phase" commenced with the first lunar landing and continued for four missions, or until sufficient experience had been achieved to allow the next phase to commence. As actually flown by NASA, these missions corresponded to Apollo 11 to Apollo 14.
- Phase 2: 1972 to 1973: This Lunar Exploration Phase would commence about two years after Apollo and consisted of four flights of the Extended Lunar Module (ELM), a modification of basic Apollo Lunar Module hardware. ELM missions extended lunar stay time to 3 or 4 days with landed payloads approaching 450 kg. This scenario corresponded to Apollo 15 to Apollo 17 as flown.
- Phase 3: 1974: A single Lunar Orbital Survey Mission was indicated after the Lunar Surface Exploration phase and would be the end of the initial buy of Apollo spacecraft. This 28-day lunar polar orbit mission would be flown after the Apollos and ELMs, in order to have several "ground-truth" sites.
- Phase 4: 1975-1976: This Lunar Surface Rendezvous and Exploration Phase nominally consisted of two dual-launch missions. A Lunar Payload Module (LPM - essentially the LM Truck of earlier studies) would be delivered by an uncrewed cargo carrier to the surface and provide a rendezvous target for a crewed ELM that would arrive up to 3 months later. The Apollo LM Shelter was essentially an Apollo LM with ascent stage engine and fuel tanks removed and replaced with consumables and scientific equipment for 14 days' extended lunar exploration.

==== Associated vehicles ====
The Apollo LM Taxi was essentially the basic Apollo LM modified for extended lunar surface stays. This was expected to be the workhorse of both Apollo Applications Extended Lunar Surface Missions beginning in 1970 and to larger Lunar Exploration System for Apollo in the mid-to-late 1970s.

The Apollo LM Shelter was essentially an Apollo LM with ascent stage engine and fuel tanks removed and replaced with consumables and scientific equipment for 14 days' extended lunar exploration.

The MOBEV F2B was a multi-person surface-to-surface flying vehicle.

=== LESA (Lunar Exploration System for Apollo) Lunar Base ===
The basic Apollo hardware would evolve into AES (Apollo Extension Systems), followed by ALSS (Apollo Logistics Support System), and then LESA (Lunar Exploration System for Apollo). The result would be ever-expanding permanent stations on the Moon.

LESA (Lunar Exploration System for Apollo) represented the last lunar base concept studied by NASA prior to the cancellation of further Saturn V production. LESA would use a new Lunar Landing Vehicle to land payloads on the lunar surface and extended CSM and LM Taxi hardware derived from the basic Apollo program would allow crews to be rotated to the ever-expanding, and eventually permanent, lunar base. A nuclear reactor would provide power.

Phases:

- 2 men/2 days - Apollo
- 2 men/14 days - AES - LM Shelter (2050 kg surface payload - LEM Shelter)
- 2 men/14 to 30 days - ALSS with shelter or MOLAB (4100 kg surface payload)
- 2-3 men/14 to 30 days - ALSS with a LASSO shelter or larger MOLAB (7900 kg surface payload)
- 3 men/90 days - LESA I (10,500 kg surface payload)
- 3 men/90 days - LESA I + MOLAB (12,500 kg surface payload)
- 6 men/180 days - LESA II with shelter and extended-range roving vehicle (25,000 kg surface payload)

=== Lunar Escape Systems ===
To support longer stays on the Moon, NASA also studied Lunar Escape Systems as a means of returning two astronauts from the lunar surface to an orbiting CSM if the Lunar Module ascent-stage engine failed to ignite.

=== Manned Venus Flyby ===
Another plan for Apollo-based extended-duration crewed spaceflight would use a Saturn V to send three men on a Manned Venus Flyby, using the Saturn S-IVB stage as a "wet workshop". First the S-IVB would boost itself and the Apollo CSM on a trajectory that would pass by Venus and return to Earth, then any remaining fuel would be vented to space, after which the astronauts would live in the empty fuel tanks until they separated from the S-IVB shortly before reentry on their return to Earth.

== Development ==
When procurement of Saturn Vs other than those required for the lunar landing was stopped in 1968, focus shifted to AAP. Aside from attempting to show that Apollo presented value for money, NASA and the main contractors of Boeing, Grumman, North American Aviation and Rockwell also hoped to put off the inevitable scaling down of staff and facilities following the completion of the first Moon landing.

Three AAP proposals were selected for development:

- The Apollo Telescope Mission would be an Earth-orbiting mission for solar observation. The telescope would be based on a modified Lunar Module ascent stage, and launched using a S-IVB. The telescope would be docked to a CSM with a three-person crew. Solar panels on the telescope would provide additional power, allowing an extended mission of 21–28 days. The telescope module would include a pressurized compartment providing additional living and workspace for the crew.
- The Apollo Manned Survey Mission proposed an Earth-observation science module also based on the LM ascent stage, and would also have been launched using a S-IVB vehicle into a high-inclination orbit. It was also proposed that a surplus Saturn V would launch a crewed lunar survey mission to establish suitable sites for later crewed landings.
- The wet workshop space station concept provided for a low-budget Earth orbiting station. The original plan, as proposed by Wernher von Braun, used the S-II stage as the primary structure of the station, with the area normally filled by the S-IVB stage replaced with an equipment carrier. These plans were modified to use the S-IVB when Saturn V production ended with just enough boosters for the lunar missions alone.

In the meantime several of the Earth-orbit "checkout" missions for Apollo had been canceled, leaving a number of Saturn IBs unused. The plans were changed to use the S-IVB stage, used on both rockets, as the primary station structure. A modified S-IVB would be launched into orbit, the second stage carrying a docking module and large solar panels in the area normally carrying the LM. A CSM would then be able to dock with the second stage and enter the now-empty fuel tanks. It was also suggested that the Apollo Telescope and Survey Mission modules might be docked to the Wet Workshop to create a modular space station.

The "Planetary Grand Tour" was moved to the Mariner program as "Mariner Jupiter-Saturn", which was later calved off into the Voyager program. Two probes were launched in 1977 on Titan IIIE rockets, with Voyager 2 completing the full Grand Tour in 1989.

== Skylab ==
Originally, AAP missions would alternate with Apollo lunar missions, starting in 1969. However, when NASA's 1969 budget was cut, focus was shifted to the Skylab space station proposal, which managed to accommodate the equipment already specified for some of the AAP missions. Specifically, Skylab included the Apollo Telescope Mission (renamed the Apollo Telescope Mount) attached to the docking station used by the CSMs. Since the first two stages of the Saturn V had enough payload capability by themselves to place a pre-fabricated S-IVB workshop into the appropriate orbit, this enabled the "dry workshop" concept. This allowed the interior space to be better fitted out, although many design concepts from the "wet" workshop, notably the open flooring that allowed fuel to flow through it, were kept in Skylab.

The concept of launching another Skylab into lunar orbit using a spare S-IVB was briefly discussed around the same time, but no justification could be found for it, so the project was abandoned early on.

== Apollo-Soyuz Test Project ==
The Apollo-Soyuz Test Project involved a docking in Earth orbit between a CSM and a Soviet Soyuz spacecraft. The mission lasted from July 15 to July 24, 1975. Although the Soviet Union continued to operate the Soyuz and Salyut space vehicles, NASA's next crewed mission would not be until STS-1 on April 12, 1981.

== Summary of missions ==
U.S. Mission	Booster	Crew	Launched	Mission goal	Mission result
Skylab 1	Saturn V	Uncrewed	May 14, 1973	Earth orbit	Partial success - launch of Skylab, first US space station; micrometeoroid shield and one solar panel lost at launch, second jammed during deployment
Skylab 2	Saturn 1B	Charles "Pete" Conrad; Paul Weitz; Joseph Kerwin	May 25, 1973	Space station mission	Success - Apollo spacecraft takes first US crew to Skylab for a 28-day stay; freed stuck solar panel and deployed replacement sunshield
Skylab 3	Saturn 1B	Alan Bean; Jack Lousma; Owen Garriott	July 28, 1973	Space station mission	Success - Apollo spacecraft takes second US crew to Skylab for a 59-day stay
Skylab 4	Saturn 1B	Gerald P. Carr; William Pogue; Edward Gibson	November 16, 1973	Space station mission	Success - Apollo spacecraft takes third US crew to Skylab for an 84-day stay
Apollo-Soyuz Test Project (ASTP)	Saturn 1B	Thomas P. Stafford; Vance D. Brand; Donald K. "Deke" Slayton	July 15, 1975	Earth orbit	Success - Apollo spacecraft conducted rendezvous and docking exercises with Soviet Soyuz 19 in Earth orbit. Upon landing, the Apollo Spacecraft was filled with toxic gas but the crew survived.
