= Space (Baxter novel) =

2000 novel by Stephen Baxter

Manifold: Space
- First edition (UK)
- Author: Stephen Baxter
- Language: English
- Series: Manifold
- Genre: Science fiction
- Publisher: Voyager (UK) & Del Rey Books (US)
- Publication date: 6 October 2000
- Publication place: Great Britain
- Media type: Print (hardback & paperback)
- Pages: 464
- ISBN: 0-00-225771-8
- OCLC: 43718099
- Preceded by: Manifold: Time
- Followed by: Manifold: Origin

Cover to the US edition

Manifold: Space is a science fiction book by British author Stephen Baxter, first published in the United Kingdom in 2000, then released in the United States in 2001. It is the second book of the Manifold series and examines another possible solution to the Fermi paradox. Although it is in no sense a sequel to the first book it contains a number of the same characters, notably protagonist Reid Malenfant, and similar artefacts. The Manifold series contains four books, Manifold: Time, Manifold: Space, Manifold: Origin, and Phase Space.

== Plot summary ==
Alien activity is discovered in a Kirkwood gap; the aliens are identified as self-replicating machines (von Neumann probes). Their activity is potentially an immense threat, as Malenfant notes in an earlier speech: "A target system, we assume, is uninhabited. We can therefore program for massive and destructive exploitation of the system's resources, without restraint, by the probe. Such resources are useless for any other purpose, and are therefore economically free to us. And so we colonize, and build."

The self-replicating spacecraft are named Gaijin (Japanese for "foreigner"), after their discovery by a Japanese observer on the Moon. Malenfant travels in a prototype fusion engine to the Kirkwood Gap and discovers an interstellar teleportation device. He travels around the galaxy to uncover information about the Fermi paradox (see below). At the same time, the story also follows the efforts of Humans on Earth and the eventual draining of the Earth's resources, making a move off-world necessary. At the same time a small group of humans use anti-aging techniques and an alien form of interstellar teleportation (Note: Teleportation using quantum entanglement – EPR correlation — to travel at light speed between transmitter and receiver) to "parachute" in on the changing solar system over many centuries.

Eventually, it is revealed that in this version of the Fermi paradox, sentient life is endemic throughout the universe; Humanity simply had not noticed it earlier because the universe destroys any race before it becomes advanced enough to develop a Type IV civilisation. The story ends with Malenfant helping the Gaijin build a shield to prevent a pulsar from sterilising a large part of the galaxy. Although this project will not be completed before another predicted pulsar event wipes out all extant species, it is hoped to give the sentient aliens who develop from the aftermath of the coming extinction a better chance at long-term survival.

== Characters ==
- Reid Malenfant – The protagonist in all four Manifold Books.
- Madeleine Meacher – Other main character, former pilot of a futuristic space plane and arms smuggler.
- Nemoto – Lunar Japanese woman who mysteriously lives for many centuries, guiding humanity against the 'alien threat'
- Dorothy Chaum – Catholic priest assigned by the pope to talk with the Gaijin at their first human contact on Earth.
- Cassiopeia – Malenfant's Gaijin companion in his explorations

== Reception ==
Publishers Weekly was positive in their review saying that "the novel covers far more territory, both in time and distance, than any one person could ever absorb is both a strength and a weakness; suspense is difficult to maintain over the course of centuries. While a large cast of characters helps generate this unwieldy scenario, only their scientific motivations are explored. Science itself is very clearly the star player on this stage. Nonetheless, this focus allows for an exceptionally intricate and original view of the future that both scientists and lay enthusiasts will enjoy." Jackie Cassada in her review for the Library Journal said that Baxter "balances the individual stories of his human protagonists against the panoramic scale of his setting in a landmark work of cosmic speculation".

== Awards ==
Manifold: Space was named by Library Journal as one of the best Science Fiction and Fantasy books of 2001.

== Publication history ==
- 2000, UK, Voyager ISBN 0-00-225771-8, Pub date 6 October 2000, hardback
- 2001, USA, Del Rey Books ISBN 0-345-43077-8, Pub date ? February 2001, hardback
- 2002, USA, Del Rey Books ISBN 0-345-43078-6, Pub date ? January 2002, paperback
