= Transposition, docking, and extraction =

Maneuver done by the Apollo spacecraft

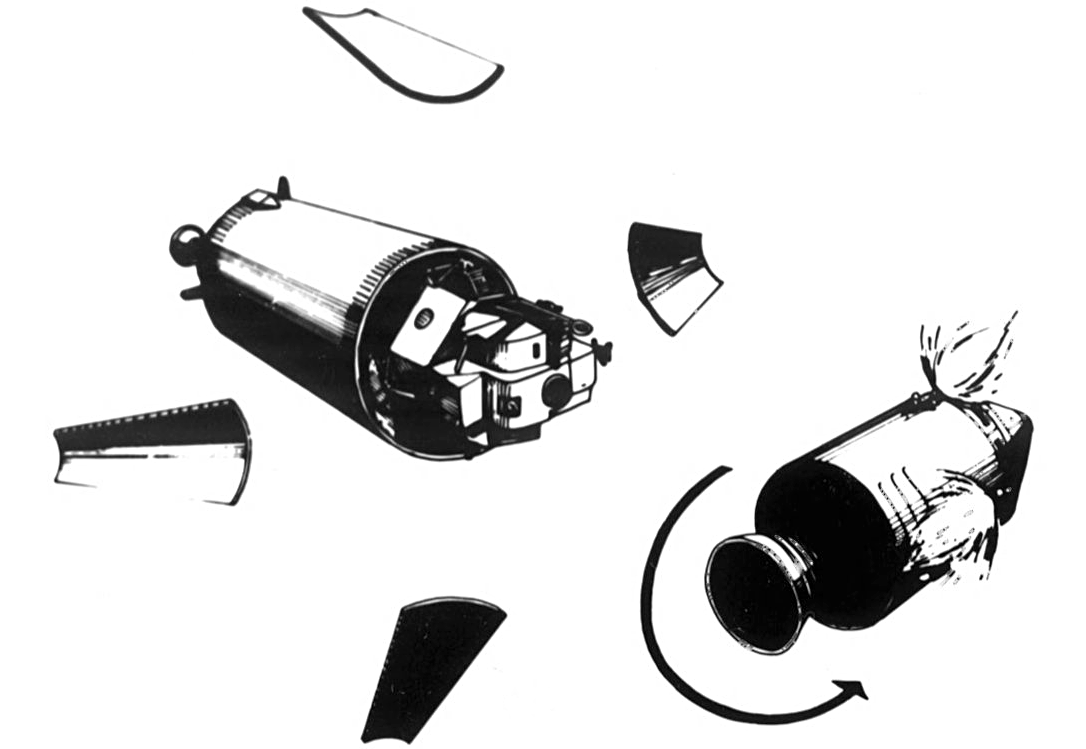
The Apollo command and service module (CSM) turns around in preparation for docking with the lunar module (LM)

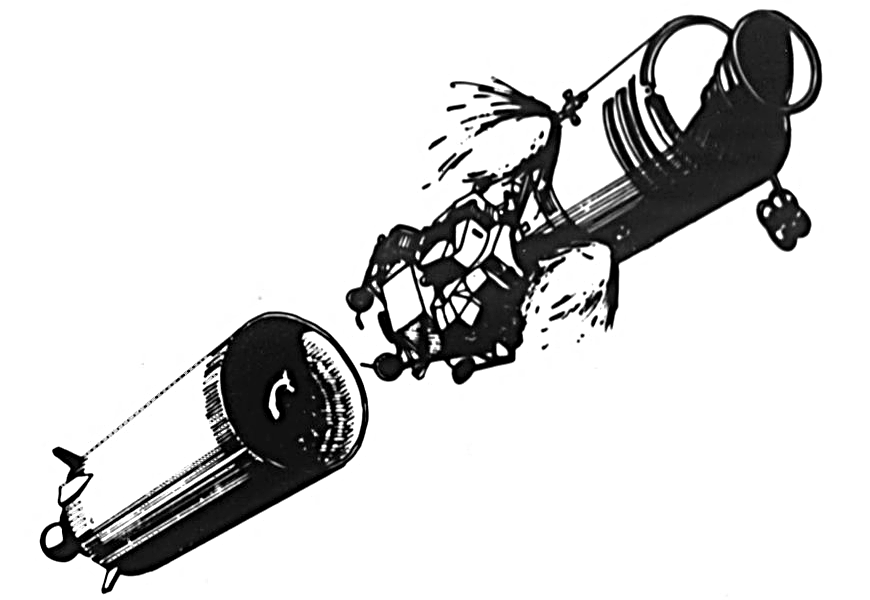
After docking, the CSM pulls the LM away from the launch vehicle's upper stage

Transposition, docking, and extraction (often abbreviated to transposition and docking) was a maneuver performed during Apollo lunar landing missions from 1969 to 1972, to withdraw the Apollo Lunar Module (LM) from its adapter housing which secured it to the Saturn V launch vehicle upper stage and protected it from the aerodynamic stresses of launch. The maneuver involved the command module pilot separating the Apollo Command and Service Module (CSM) from the adapter, turning the CSM around, and docking its nose to the Lunar Module, then pulling the combined spacecraft away from the upper stage. It was performed shortly after the trans-lunar injection maneuver that placed the Apollo spacecraft on a three-day trajectory to the Moon. The docking created a continuous, pressurized tunnel which permitted the astronauts to transfer internally between the CSM and the LM.

The same maneuver was performed on the 1975 Apollo–Soyuz Test Project (ASTP) mission to extract a special docking module used to connect the Apollo Command Module with the Soyuz spacecraft.

== Procedure ==
Alfred Worden docks the Apollo 15 Command Module Endeavour to the Lunar Module Falcon

Transposition and docking was performed by the Command Module Pilot (CMP) (although, as a backup, the Commander and Lunar Module Pilot (or ASTP Docking Module Pilot) were also trained to perform the maneuver), and involved the following steps:

1. A "CSM/LV Sep" button on the control panel was pressed, which ignited detonating cord and separated the CSM from the Spacecraft–lunar module adapter (SLA), and the four adapter panels from each other and the S-IVB upper stage. This exposed the LM.
2. The CSM's translation thrusters were used to move it a safe distance away. Rotation thrusters were then used to pitch up the CSM 180° and roll it to the proper alignment angle for docking. Translation thrusters were then used to move it back to the LM. A T-shaped docking target on the top of the LM aligned optically with a reticle pattern on the CMP's left-hand docking window to ensure proper spacecraft alignment.
3. A soft dock was achieved when a probe at the top of the CSM was inserted into a hole in the center of a cone-shaped drogue at the top of the LM and three small capture latches closed. Hard dock was achieved by activating a mechanism which retracted the probe and caused twelve more capture latches to close around the command module's docking flange.
4. A pressure equalization valve in the CM forward hatch was opened to allow oxygen to fill the LM through a similar valve in its hatch that was left open at launch. When the pressure equalized, the pilot removed the CM hatch, removed the probe and drogue, inspected the capture latches, and connected two umbilical cables which electrically connected the CM and LM. He then replaced the CM hatch.
5. The LM hold-down attachments and umbilical connection to the S-IVB Instrument Unit were released, and the CSM's translation thrusters were used to pull the CSM/LM stack a safe distance away from the S-IVB, which would then be steered by ground control either to a heliocentric orbit, or to a deliberate crash landing on the Moon.

The astronauts were in no hurry to complete this maneuver, which nominally took about an hour. It would take longer if problems were encountered; for instance, Stuart Roosa had trouble getting the capture latches to engage for docking on Apollo 14, and the procedure took two hours and eighteen minutes.

== Missions ==
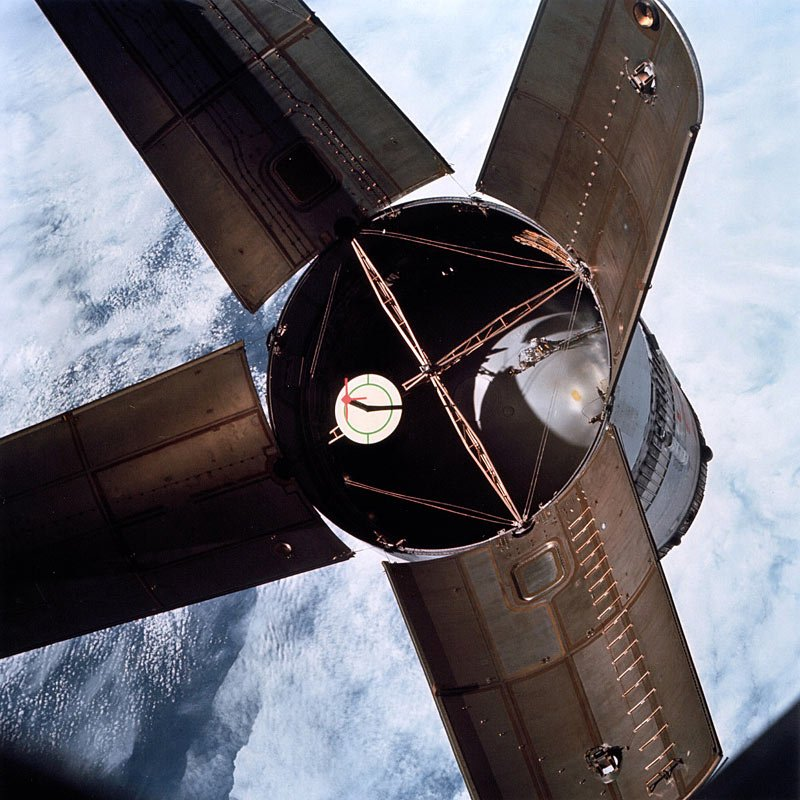
Apollo 7 S-IVB, with docking target inside the SLA. Note the right-hand panel is not fully opened to the same angle as the others, preventing a safe simulated docking approach.

Transposition and docking was performed on all Apollo missions which carried both the CSM and the LM, from Apollo 9 onward. Transposition and a mock LM-docking approach was first simulated on the Earth-orbiting Apollo 7 flight (which carried a docking target in the SLA, but no LM). The "Block I" SLA used on the early Saturn IB launch vehicles had panels that opened at a 45° angle but did not separate from the S‑IVB. One of the panels did not open the full angle, preventing the crew from approaching the S‑IVB for fear they might strike this panel. This was corrected with the "Block II" SLA design used on all crewed Saturn V Apollo flights (starting with Apollo 8), which detached the panels and pushed them away from the S‑IVB with springs.

The last mission to use the maneuver was the Apollo–Soyuz Test Project mission, in which the Apollo CSM docked to a specially designed adapter module which carried docking equipment compatible with the Soyuz 19 spacecraft.

== See also ==
- Manned Venus flyby – a transposition and docking maneuver would have been required on this mission
