= Manifold Trilogy =

Novel trilogy by Stephen Baxter

The Manifold Trilogy is a series of science fiction books by British author Stephen Baxter. The series was published from 1999 to 2003. It consists of three novels and an anthology of short stories relating to the three. The three novels in the trilogy are not ordered chronologically; instead, they are thematically linked novels that take place in alternate universes.

The series consists of:

- Manifold: Time - Arthur C. Clarke Award nominee, 2000
- Manifold: Space
- Manifold: Origin
- Phase Space (short stories)

== Similarities ==
Each novel contains the same or mostly similar characters, though these characters find themselves in wildly different circumstances in each story. The protagonist in all three novels is a man named Reid Malenfant, a brash, ambitious entrepreneur and former astronaut who gets drawn up into the complexities of each novel's plot. Each novel starts off on Earth, in a relatively mundane near future, but eventually expands into the far future and deep space.

== Fermi paradox ==
Each one of the main novels deals with a possible resolution to the Fermi paradox. The first, Time, is set in a universe that is completely devoid of intelligent life beyond that of mankind and its creations (i.e. A.I. and uplifted animals).

The second in the series, Space, proposes the opposite: that life is endemic to the universe, and there is intelligence in nearly all possible places of the cosmos. The solution to the Fermi Paradox in this novel is that intelligent life is continually wiped out by cosmic disasters before it has time to spread too far.

The third novel, Origin, is set in a multiverse that is a compromise between the ideals in the first two novels: that life is only on Earth, but at the same time is everywhere. This novel solves the Fermi Paradox by suggesting that intelligent life is segregated into separate parallel universes.
