= Time (novel) =

1999 novel by Stephen Baxter

Manifold: Time
- First edition (UK)
- Author: Stephen Baxter
- Original title: Time
- Cover artist: Tony and Daphine Hallas/Science Photo Library
- Language: English
- Series: Manifold
- Genre: Science fiction
- Publisher: Voyager (UK); Del Rey Books (USA)
- Publication date: 1999
- Publication place: United Kingdom
- Media type: Print (hardback & paperback)
- Pages: 456
- ISBN: 0-00-225768-8
- OCLC: 41258602
- Followed by: Manifold: Space

Manifold: Time is a 1999 science fiction novel by Stephen Baxter. It is the first of Baxter's Manifold Trilogy (the others being Manifold: Space and Manifold: Origin), although the books can be read in any order because the series takes place in a multiverse.

The book was nominated for the 2000 Arthur C. Clarke Award.

== Plot summary ==
Time is set on Earth, the inner part of the Solar System and various other universes onwards from the 21st century. The novel covers a wide range of topics, including the Doomsday argument, Fermi paradox, genetic engineering, and humanity's extinction.

The book begins at the end of space and time, when the last descendants of humanity face an infinite but pointless existence. Due to proton decay, the physical universe has collapsed, but some form of intelligence has survived by embedding itself into a lossless computing substrate where it can theoretically survive indefinitely. However, because there will never be new input, eventually all possible thoughts will be exhausted. Some portion of this intelligence decides that this should not have been the ultimate fate of the universe, and takes action to change the past, centering on the early 21st century. The changes come in several forms, including a message to Reid Malenfant, the appearance of super-intelligent children around the world, and the discovery of a mysterious gateway on asteroid 3753 Cruithne.

Baxter's short story "Sheena 5" explores an alternate ending to the story of Sheena, the intelligent squid.

== Characters ==
- Reid Malenfant – protagonist
- Emma Stoney – Malenfant's ex-wife and employee
- Cornelius Taine – brilliant eschatologist mathematician
- Sheena – a genetically engineered squid
- Maura Della – concerned politician
- Michael – a "Blue" child savant and guide to Reid
- Dan Ystebo – marine scientist
- Anna – oldest of the "Blue" savant children

== Style ==
Time is split into four parts and then into smaller sections that each focus on a different character.

== Release details ==
- 1999, UK, Voyager (HarperCollins) ISBN 0-00-225768-8, Pub date 2 August 1999, hardback
- 2000, UK, Voyager (HarperCollins) ISBN 0-00-651182-1, Pub date 7 August 2000, paperback
- 2000, USA, Del Rey Books ISBN 0-345-43075-1, Pub date ? January 2000, hardback
- 2000, USA, Del Rey Books ISBN 0-345-43076-X, Pub date ? November 2000, paperback
