= Origin (Baxter novel) =

2001 novel by Stephen Baxter

Manifold: Origin
- Cover to the first edition
- Author: Stephen Baxter
- Cover artist: Photonica
- Language: English
- Series: Manifold
- Genre: Science fiction
- Publisher: Voyager
- Publication date: 2001
- Publication place: United Kingdom
- Media type: Print (hardback & paperback)
- Pages: 441
- ISBN: 0-345-43079-4
- OCLC: 48390748
- Dewey Decimal: 823/.914 21
- LC Class: PR6052.A849 M34 2002
- Preceded by: Manifold: Space
- Followed by: Phase Space

Manifold: Origin (2001) is a science fiction novel by British author Stephen Baxter, the third instalment in the Manifold Trilogy. As with the other books, the protagonist Reid Malenfant is put through a scenario dealing with the Fermi paradox. Each novel is an alternative scenario rather than a chronological sequel, and does not occur in the same universe. Manifold: Origin explores primate evolution to create an explanation for our lack of contact with other intelligent species.

== Plot ==
In 2015, the Earth's Moon vanishes to be replaced by a red moon. The new moon is more massive, causing devastating effects on Earth. It is also crawling with life. Meanwhile, a mysterious glowing construct appears in the skies over the African continent. NASA astronaut, Reid Malenfant, flying over Africa in a T-38 training jet with his wife, Emma, decides to investigate. They collide with what appears to be a large floating wheel out of which people are falling. Ejected from the plane, Emma falls through the wheel.

Emma wakes up on a strange Earth-like world that is populated by many species of Hominidae, most of which are long extinct on Earth. Unable to think of a better plan for survival, Emma and a small group of survivors who fell through the wheel join a group of "Runners" (Homo erectus), who, after an initial confrontation resulting in the death of one of the survivors, allow them to tag along. Back on Earth, Malenfant campaigns to get a mission launched to the red moon, feeling in his heart that Emma is up there. He is ultimately successful, and, along with a Japanese scientist named Nemoto, takes off in a hastily put-together rescue mission.

Emma and the Runners encounter other species, including a group of violent "Elfs" (Australopithecine), the "Hams" (Neanderthal), as well as an unnamed orangutan-like species known as "Nutcracker Men". Malenfant reaches the red moon and encounters a colony of British explorers. Upon staying with them, Malenfant learns that the red moon has been hopping between universes, scooping up the native hominids through the wheel-like constructs Malenfant had encountered over Africa. The British explorers hail from a universe where the British Empire is still going strong and has become a spacefaring nation, albeit one with technologies and cultural values more akin to the early twentieth century in Malenfant's universe.

Emma encounters a race of hyper-intelligent hominids that appear gorilla-like to her. They arrived from a version of Earth that had no moon and is constantly bombarded by high winds. Like the British explorers, the gorilla-like hominids came to the red moon by choice to investigate. Malenfant and Emma are finally reunited, and a diverse party of hominids led by the hyper-intelligent gorilla-like explorers journey to the centre of the red moon and learn of the moon's creators, hypothesizing what their goals might have been.

== Characters ==
- Emma Stoney – The central protagonist of this story and wife of Reid Malenfant
- Reid Malenfant – NASA astronaut, a protagonist across all books in the Manifold series
- Nemoto – A fiercely intelligent Japanese scientist who accompanies Malenfant to the Red Moon
- McCann – A British explorer stranded on the Red Moon
- Fire – A member of the Homo erectus, or "Runners"
- Joshua – A Neanderthal, or "Ham"
- Shadow – An Australopithecine who endures several hardships at the hands of her own kind
- Manekatapokanemahedo – The leader of a group of hyper-intelligent gorilla-like hominids

== Style ==
Cover to the US edition

Origin is written in a third-person omniscient style. Rather than chapters, the story is divided into sections that follow the perspective of a particular character, with each section being titled with the character's name.

== Reception ==
Jeff Zaleski was mixed in his review for Publishers Weekly saying that "a variety of characters speculate on the simpler aspects of Darwinian theory, but somewhat disappointingly they all reach the same conclusion. Gratuitous violence from time to time offers relief from the challenge of keeping straight the host of loosely related story lines. Baxter fans should be well satisfied, but those who prefer more thought-provoking SF will need to look elsewhere." Roland Green in his review for Booklist was much more positive saying "Baxter uses many more characters and viewpoint shifts than Arthur C. Clarke in support of a theme that recalls Clarke's classic Childhood's End (1953). He also details survival in primitive societies unsparingly; as a result, much of the book is not for the weak of stomach. Lovers of intelligent variations on classic sf themes, however, will embrace this worthy successor to Manifold: Time (2000) and Manifold: Space (2001)."
