= NASA Trilogy =

Hard science fiction trilogy by Stephen Baxter

The NASA Trilogy consists of three hard science fiction novels written by British science fiction author Stephen Baxter. They were published from 1996 to 1998. These books explore the possibilities of the American space program if the circumstances had been different. They have generally darker tones than his other books and are critical of NASA. They consist of:

== Books ==
| Title | Description |
|---|---|
| Voyage | A crew of three travels to Mars in spacecraft based on Apollo hardware. A parallel storyline deals with the development of the program and the astronaut selection. Arthur C. Clarke Award nominee, 1997 |
| Titan | A crew travels to Saturn's moon Titan in a modified space shuttle and Apollo command modules to find organic compounds. Arthur C. Clarke Award nominee, 1998 |
| Moonseed | A mysterious substance called "moonseed" is brought to Earth in a Moon rock that begins to destroy the planet. |
