= Moonseed (novel) =

1998 novel by Stephen Baxter

- First edition cover
- Author: Stephen Baxter
- Cover artist: Chris Moore
- Language: English
- Series: NASA Trilogy
- Genre: Science fiction
- Publisher: Voyager Books (UK)
- Publication date: 3 August 1998
- Publication place: United Kingdom
- Media type: Print (hardback & paperback)
- Pages: 500
- ISBN: 0-00-225426-3
- OCLC: 39606642
- Preceded by: Titan

Moonseed is a 1998 science fiction novel by British author Stephen Baxter, and the final book in the NASA Trilogy. The story envisions an alternate history in which the canceled Apollo missions went ahead as planned.

== Plot summary ==
Moonseed is an exploration of what could have happened when a rock is returned from the Apollo 18 mission (which was actually cancelled in 1970). In the book, the rock contains a form of grey goo called "moonseed" that starts to change all inorganic matter on Earth into more moonseed. It also gets transferred by a NASA probe to Venus, and the explosion of Venus is the first clue as to what has been happening.

Stephen Baxter combines a host of disciplines (space travel, geology and disaster theory) to tell a tale where the rocks are literally swept from under the feet of humanity. During the course of the novel, in which Edinburgh is the focus for much of the action, Venus is destroyed by an unknown cosmic event that showers the Earth with radiation that somehow stirs the moonseed on Earth. When Moon-dust containing the moonseed is dropped onto the streets of Edinburgh by a lab assistant of the main character, Earth's fate is sealed. The moonseed begins to disintegrate the planet from the inside-out as the core heats up exponentially, while on the surface, nuclear power stations catastrophically fail, earthquakes and volcanic eruptions are abundant, and billions of people die as cities and continents vanish.

Over the course of the cataclysmic erosion of Earth, a collective of scientists and engineers from various space agencies from around the world desperately try to terraform the Moon for colonisation, to provide a safe haven for some surviving humans before Earth eventually disintegrates into nothingness along with human civilisation.

This novel also presents numerous theories and ideas about the space-faring future of humanity, albeit in an alternate dimension where we are forced into space by an eroding Earth. It is also, in many stages, critical of NASA's performance over the last thirty years, as well as the United Kingdom's disaster programs.

== See also ==
- Apollo 18, a film which uses a similar starting-point, but develops it very differently.
- Geology of the Moon
- Terraforming of the Moon
- Apocalyptic and post-apocalyptic fiction
