= Manned Venus flyby =

Proposed crewed Venus flyby

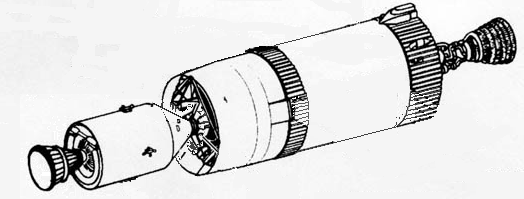
Manned Venus Flyby spacecraft consisting of an S-IVB stage as a "wet workshop" and an Apollo CSM

A manned Venus flyby is a proposed crewed space mission in which astronauts would travel to Venus, fly past the planet without landing, and return to Earth. Such missions were studied by both the United States and the Soviet Union during the Space Race as potential deep-space expeditions beyond the Moon. Several concepts were developed in the 1960s and 1970s, including plans based on the Apollo Applications Program and Soviet interplanetary spacecraft proposals, but none were carried out.

There was a 1967–1968 NASA proposal to send three astronauts on a flyby mission to Venus in an Apollo-derived spacecraft in 1973–1974, using a gravity assist to shorten the return journey to Earth.

== Apollo Applications Program ==
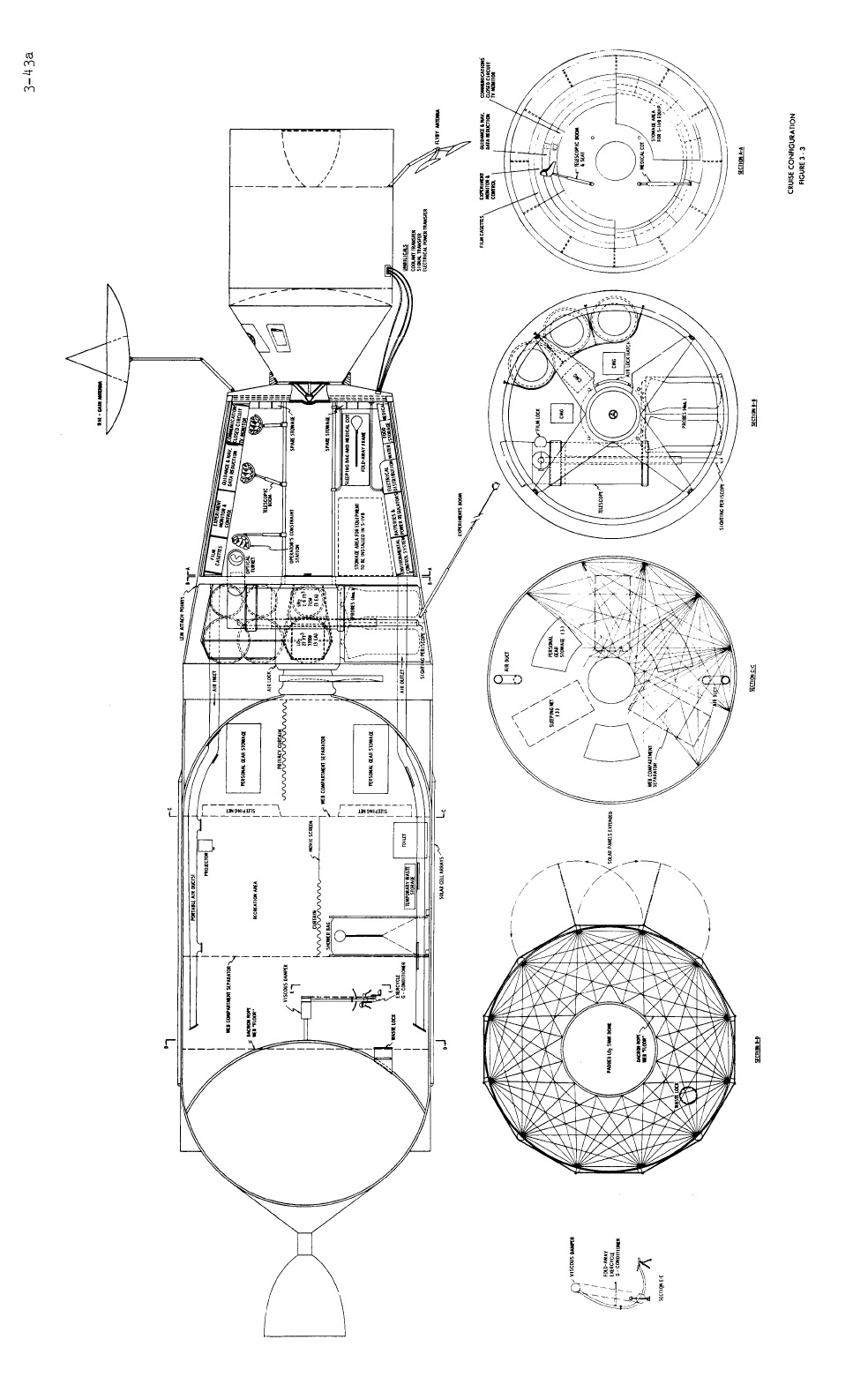
Cutaway diagram of the Venus flyby spacecraft

In the mid-1960s, NASA considered "a three-man flyby of Venus" as part of the Apollo Applications Program, using hardware derived from the Apollo program. Several mission profiles were considered for launch during the 1970s and the 1973 mission appears to be the one that received most serious consideration and is best documented. Launch would have taken place on October 31, 1973, with a Venus flyby on March 3, 1974 and return to Earth on December 1, 1974.

=== Background ===
The proposed mission would have used a Saturn V to send three astronauts on a flight past Venus, which would have lasted approximately one year. The S-IVB stage would have been a "wet workshop" similar to the original design of Skylab. In this concept, the interior of the fuel tank would be filled with living quarters and various equipment that did not take up a significant amount of volume. The S-IVB would then be filled with propellants as normal and used to accelerate the craft on its way to Venus. Once the burn was complete, any remaining propellant would be vented to space, and then the larger fuel tank could be used as living space, while the smaller oxygen tank would be used for waste storage.

Only so much equipment could be carried in the hydrogen tank without taking up too much room, while other pieces could not be immersed in liquid hydrogen and survive. This equipment would instead be placed in the interstage area between the S-IVB and the Apollo Command/Service Module (CSM), known as the Spacecraft-LM Adapter (SLA), which normally held the Apollo Lunar Module on lunar missions. To maximize the amount of space available in this area, the Service Propulsion System engine of the CSM would be replaced by two LM Descent Propulsion System engines. These had much smaller engine bells, and would lie within the Service Module instead of extending out the end into the SLA area. This also provided redundancy in the case of a single-engine failure. These engines would have been responsible for both course correction during the flight and the braking burn for Earth re-entry.

Unlike the Apollo lunar missions, the CSM would perform its transposition and docking maneuver with the S-IVB stage before the burn to leave Earth orbit, rather than after. This meant the astronauts would have flown "eyeballs-out", the thrust of the engine pushing them out of their seats rather than into them. This was required because there was only a short window for an abort burn by the CSM to return to Earth after a failure in the S-IVB, so all spacecraft systems needed to be operational and checked out before leaving the parking orbit around Earth to fly to Venus.

Precursors to the Venus flyby would include an initial orbital test flight with an S-IVB "wet workshop" and basic docking adapter, and a year-long test flight taking the S-IVB to a near-geostationary orbit around the Earth.

=== Scientific objectives ===
The mission would have measured:

- Density, temperature and pressure of Venus's atmosphere as functions of altitude, latitude and time.
- Definition of the planetary surface and its properties.
- Chemical composition of the low atmosphere and the planetary surface.
- Ionospheric data such as radio reflectivity and electron density and properties of cloud layers.
- Optical astronomy – UV and IR measurements above the Earth's atmosphere to aid in the determination of the spatial distribution of hydrogen.
- Solar astronomy – UV, X-ray and possible infrared measurements of the solar spectrum and space monitoring of solar events.
- Radio and radar astronomy - radio observations to map the brightness of the radio sky and to investigate solar, stellar and planetary radio emissions; radar measurements of the surface of Venus and Mercury
- X-ray astronomy – measurements to identify new X-ray sources in the galactic system and to obtain additional information on sources previously identified.
- Data on the Earth-Venus interplanetary environment, including particulate radiation, magnetic fields and meteoroids.
- Data on the planet Mercury, which would have been in mutual planetary alignment with Venus approximately two weeks after the Venus flyby.

=== Mission development ===
The mission would have been implemented in a series of two development flights and one production flight, designated as phases A through C.

==== Phase A ====
Phase A of the plan would have launched a "wet workshop" S-IVB and a standard Block II Apollo CSM into orbit on a Saturn V. The crew would separate the CSM from the S-IVB by blowing off the SLA panels, then perform a transposition and docking maneuver similar to that conducted on the lunar flights, in order to dock with the docking module attached to the front of the S-IVB. Optionally they could then use the S-IVB engine to launch them into a high orbit before they vented any remaining propellant into space and entered the S-IVB fuel tank to conduct experiments for a few weeks. After evaluating the use of the S-IVB as a long-term habitat for astronauts, they would separate the CSM from the S-IVB and return to Earth.

==== Phase B ====
Phase B would test the Venus flyby spacecraft in a long duration mission in high orbit. A Saturn V would launch a Block III CSM designed for long-term spaceflight and a modified S-IVB with the Environmental Support Module required for the real Venus flyby, and following the transposition and docking maneuver the S-IVB engine would carry the spacecraft to a circular orbit at an altitude of about 25,000 miles around the Earth. This altitude would be high enough to be clear of Earth's radiation belts while exposing the spacecraft to an environment similar to that of a trip to Venus, yet close enough to Earth that the astronauts could use the CSM to return in a few hours in an emergency.

Power would probably have been provided by solar panels similar to those used on Skylab, as fuel cells would require a very large amount of fuel to operate for a year. Similarly the fuel cells in the SM used to provide power on lunar flights would be replaced by batteries which would provide enough power for the duration of launch and re-entry operations.

==== Phase C ====
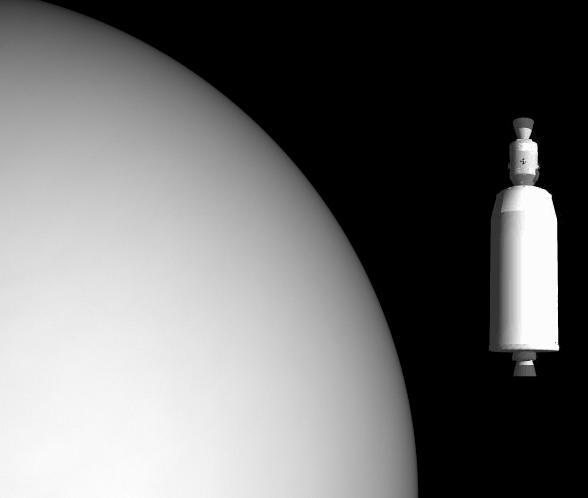
Venus flyby spacecraft near Venus

Phase C would be the actual flyby, using a Block IV CSM and an updated version of the Venus flyby S-IVB which would carry a large radio antenna for communication with Earth and two or more small probes which would be released shortly before the flyby to enter the atmosphere of Venus. The Block IV CSM has LM engines replacing the Service Propulsion System engines, batteries to replace the fuel cells, and other modifications to support long-range communication with Earth and the higher re-entry velocities required for the return trajectory compared to a return from lunar orbit.

The Phase C mission was planned for a launch in late October or early November 1973, when the velocity requirements to reach Venus and the duration of the resulting mission would be at their lowest. After a brief stay in Earth parking orbit to check out the spacecraft, the crew would have headed for Venus. In the event of a major problem during the trans-Venus injection burn, there would have been roughly an hour to separate the CSM from the S-IVB and use the SM engine to cancel out most of the velocity gained from the burn. This would put the craft into a highly elliptical orbit which would typically bring it back to Earth for re-entry two or three days later. Beyond that time window, the SM engine would not have had enough propellant to bring the CSM back to Earth before the SM batteries ran out of power. At that point, it would literally be "Venus or Bust".

After a successful S-IVB burn, the spacecraft would have passed approximately 3000 miles from the surface of Venus about four months later. The flyby velocity would be so high that the crew would only have had a few hours for detailed study of the planet. At this point, one or more robotic probe landers would have separated from the main craft to land on Venus.

During the rest of the mission, the crew would have performed astronomical studies of the Sun and Mercury, approaching within 0.3 astronomical units.

== TMK-MAVR ==
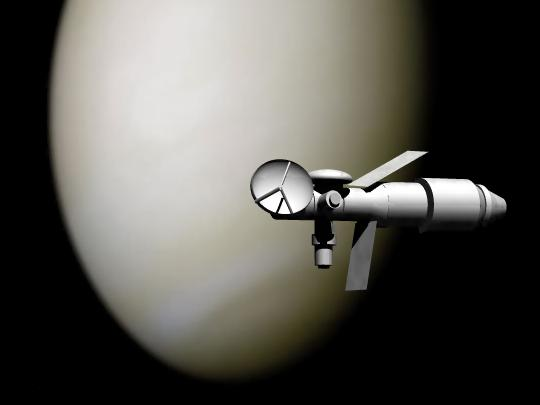
Artist's depiction of TMK-MAVR on a Venus flyby

One variant of the Soviet Union's planned TMK mission to Mars in 1971–1974 involved a flyby of Venus on the return voyage, and was given the code name "MAVR" (MArs - VeneRa), meaning Mars - Venus. However, the TMK program was cancelled after the N1 rocket that was needed to loft the mission failed to fly successfully.

== See also ==
- Colonization of Venus
- High Altitude Venus Operational Concept
- Crocco's Multiplanetary Trajectory
- Human mission to Mars
- TMK (Soviet flyby plan)
- Inspiration Mars - defunct plan for a Mars flyby that might have included Venus
