= Titan (Baxter novel) =

1997 novel by Stephen Baxter

- First edition
- Author: Stephen Baxter
- Cover artist: Chris Moore
- Language: English
- Series: NASA Trilogy
- Genre: Science fiction
- Publisher: Voyager (UK)
- Publication date: 18 July 1997
- Publication place: United Kingdom
- Media type: Print (hardback & paperback)
- Pages: 581 (hardback)
- ISBN: 0-00-225424-7
- OCLC: 37950953
- Preceded by: Voyage
- Followed by: Moonseed

Titan is a 1997 science fiction novel by British writer Stephen Baxter. The book depicts a crewed mission to Titan—the enigmatic moon of Saturn—which has a thick atmosphere and a chemical makeup that some think may contain the building blocks of life. Titan was nominated for the Arthur C. Clarke Award in 1998.

== Plot summary ==
The novel explores a range of possible attitudes toward space exploration and science in the early twenty-first century in which Baxter lays down his concerns about anti-intellectualism and the loss of the pioneering spirit in modern American politics and culture. In Titan, the United States is ruled by a fundamentalist Christian President named Xavier Maclachlan who, believing Earth is the centre of the universe, orders the equal treatment of the Ptolemaic model of the Solar System in high school curricula, all the while youth culture goes into a rebellious downward spiral with the widespread adoption of digital entertainment technology. Due to its far-right isolationist policies, the United States have severed ties with the rest of the world (including within themselves with seceding nation-states), especially while tensions grow with the emerging power of China, which is engaged in a determined bid to gain control of space after the American Shuttle program comes crashing down with the loss of Columbia (but not in the same way as actual events. In this timeline, instead of disintegrating on re-entry the shuttle makes an irreparable crash landing with the loss of two of the crew), and NASA has no public or political support to help recover from the accident. Consequently, under the militaristic Maclachlan's executive plans, the US military merges with the space agency for its resources to be diverted into defence spending, including using its space-faring vehicles as weapons platforms and forcing NASA to develop ethnically targeted biological weapons tailored to attack the Chinese.

Amid this negative climate and seeing no future for themselves after the permanent shutdown of the space program or for the decadent future of humanity, a small team of scientists and astronauts consisting of Paula Bencerraf, a survivor of the Columbia disaster, Isaac Rosenberg, a JPL scientist, Siohban Libet and Nicola Mott, two International Space Station astronauts and lovers, and Bill Angel, an astronaut, must persuade NASA to fund a crewed mission to Titan to confirm findings of life from the Cassini and to rejuvenate interest in space exploration to the world. They do so by recycling older spacecraft for several purposes: space shuttle Atlantis is refitted to carry cargo into orbit as well as a restored Saturn V for construction of the main ship (a heavily modified version of Discovery using the Shuttle OMS engines for chemical propulsion and powered by a TOPAZ nuclear reactor), using habitat modules from the mothballed International Space Station, and Apollo re-entry capsules are adapted to become Titan landers. On the day of the last launch to begin the mission, with the shuttle Endeavour ready to carry the crew to space, an insane USAF general driven by shallow militarism and hatred for space exploration tries to shoot down the shuttle during lift off. Despite damage sustained from an anti-satellite missile fired from a restored X-15, Endeavour successfully makes it into orbit, and the five crew members begin their six-year journey to Saturn by using a chain of Gravity assist similar to that used by Cassini.

En route, Siohban Libet, one of the astronauts, dies after a solar storm. The use of a CELSS greenhouse for life support provides a continuous food supply, and the astronauts rely on vegetables, grain and fruit from the greenhouse as they travel on, and recycle waste via supercritical water oxidation. But things take a dark turn as funding and support for resupply and Earth-return retrieval are cut by Maclachlan's administration (proposed and carried out by the very same men that tried to shoot the shuttle down), leaving the team with no hope for survival beyond what they may find on Titan. Once they reach Saturn and prepare to land on Titan's surface, another crew member is lost during the landing procedure with another effectively crippled. Titan is discovered to be a bleak, freezing dwarf-planet containing liquid ethane oceans, a sticky mud-like surface composed of tholins, and a climate which includes a thick atmosphere of purple organic compounds falling like snow from the clouds; and the only traces of life they find are fossilised remains of microbic bacteria similar to those recovered from Martian meteorites. The remaining astronauts relay their findings back to a largely uninterested Earth.

Meanwhile, the Chinese, to retaliate for biological attacks by the US, send an astronaut (incidentally the first Chinese to go into space) to cause a huge explosion next to an asteroid (2002OA) in a suicide attack, with the aim of deflecting it into Earth orbit and threatening the world with targeted precision strikes in the future. Unfortunately, their calculations are wrong as they didn't take into account the size of the asteroid which could cause a Cretaceous–Paleogene extinction event. The asteroid strikes Earth, critically damaging the planetary ecosystem. The Titan team members are presumably the last humans left alive.

As the surviving astronauts slowly die of disease and in-fighting, they decide to try to ensure life will continue to survive: they take a flask of bacteria and drop it into a crater filled with liquid water, in the hope that some form of life will develop.

The novel's final sequence depicts the final two crew members returned to life through some unspecified alien process on Titan where they died, several billion years in the future. The Sun has entered its red giant phase, warming the Saturnian system and aiding the evolution of life, in the form of strange, intelligent beetle-like creatures, on Titan. The astronauts watch as the creatures build a fleet of slow interstellar probes to seed new planetary systems before the expanding Sun boils off the surface of the moon.

== Allusions/references to actual history, geography and current science ==
The depiction of Titan's surface is speculation based on respectable scientific data that was available in 1997—in fact the book "Lifting Titan's Veil" notes that Baxter's story paraphrases closely sections of papers by Lorenz on raindrops on Titan and the geomorphology of crater lakes. The Cassini probe's study of Titan, which began in 2005, would confirm the existence of bodies of liquid on the moon.

== See also ==
- Return from the Stars
