= Wet workshop =

Space station made from a spent rocket stage

A preliminary version of what became known as Skylab, designed as a wet workshop with the engine attached

A wet workshop is a space station made from a spent liquid-propellant rocket stage. Such a rocket stage contains two large, airtight propellant tanks; it was realized that the larger tank could be retrofitted into the living quarters of a space station, while the smaller one could be used for the storage of waste. A large rocket stage would reach a low Earth orbit and undergo later modification. This would make for a cost-effective reuse of hardware that would otherwise have no further purpose, but the in-orbit modification of the rocket stage could prove difficult and expensive. As of October 2026, no wet-workshop space station has been built or flown.

A wet workshop is contrasted with a "dry workshop", where the empty upper stage is internally outfitted on the ground before launch with a human habitat and other equipment. It is not filled with propellant; instead the stage is launched into orbit by a sufficiently powerful rocket.

The Apollo Applications Program of the 1960s studied using the Saturn V second stage S-II, and later planned to use the Saturn IB second stage S-IVB as a wet workshop, but cancellation of some Apollo program lunar landing missions made a two-stage Saturn V available to launch the station known as Skylab as an S-IVB dry workshop.

== Apollo-derived concepts ==
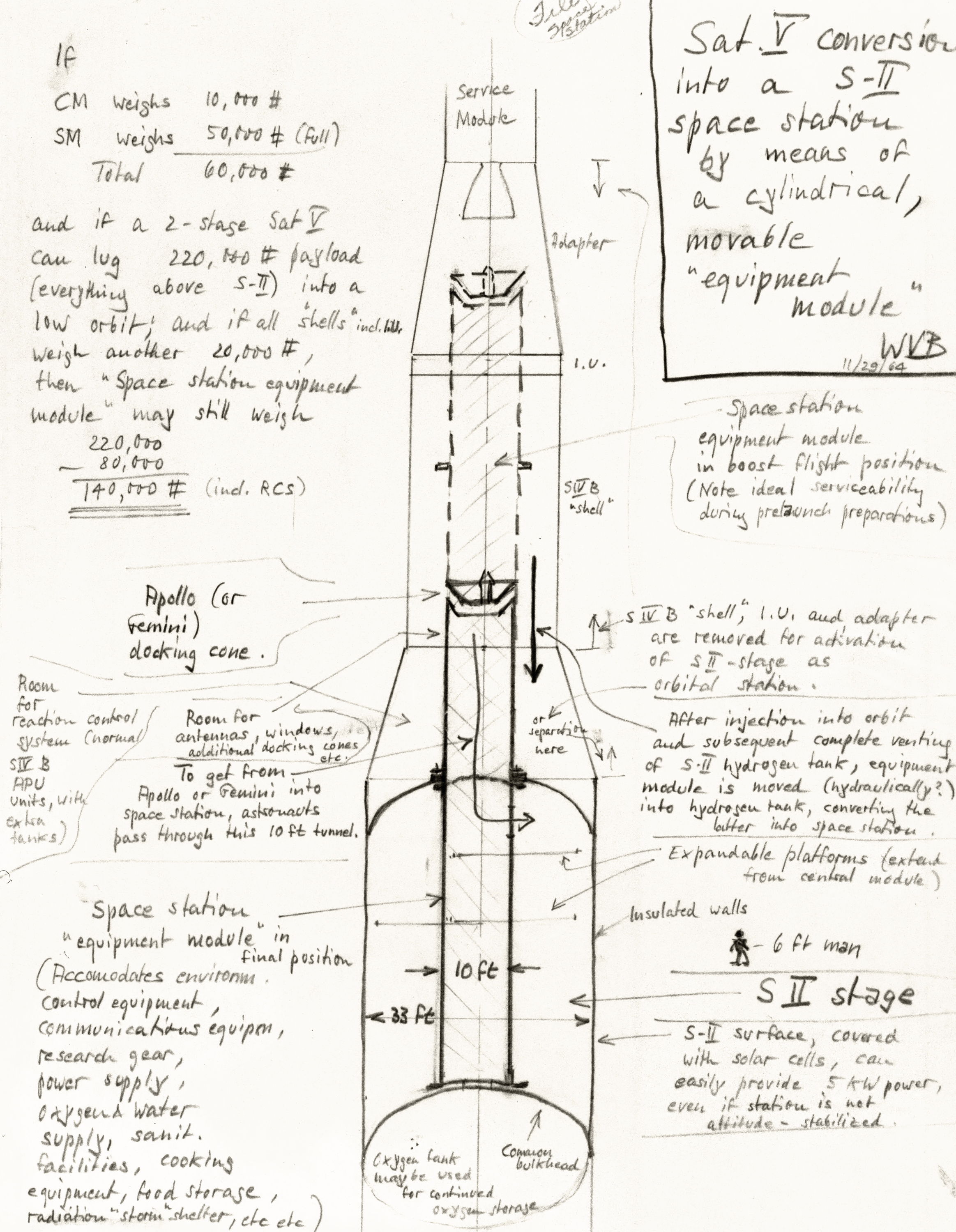
Von Braun's sketch of a Space Station based on conversion of a Saturn V stage, 1964.

Wernher von Braun proposed a wet workshop concept for launch on the Saturn V. His design modified the S-II second stage of the Saturn V stack to allow it to be used as living space once reaching orbit. Since the S-IC lower stage of the Saturn V cannot reach orbit on its own, the S-II would have to fire, and then vent out any remaining propellant once it reached orbit. To allow this, the floors of the station would be made of an open grid which allowed the propellant to pass through easily to the piping at the bottom of the tanks. The structure also presented convenient hand and footholds.

Since the entire propellant load would be needed to reach orbit, additional life support equipment could not be stored inside the S-II during launch. von Braun's design placed all of this ancillary equipment in a large cylindrical carrier, which would be carried on top of the S-II stage in place of the S-IVB normally placed there. After reaching orbit and venting, a large access hatch in the top of the S-II's hydrogen tank would be opened. The cylindrical cargo module would then be inserted hydraulically into the tank through this opening, sealed, and then the tank would be repressurized to form a large living space. Power would be provided by solar cells lining the outside of the S-II.

During the 1960s, as the Apollo mission transitioned from development to launch, a number of groups inside NASA were studying the post-Apollo era. Many ideas for continuing use of the existing Saturn hardware were proposed, and some of these were collected under the name "Apollo X", which became the Apollo Applications Program (AAP). By the time AAP started to receive funding, the Saturn V lines were planned to shut down after producing just enough Saturn Vs for the Moon missions alone. However, during the same period of time, on-orbit testing of the Apollo systems was proceeding much better than expected, and a number of proposed shake-down missions were no longer required. This left a small number of Saturn IB launchers available for use.

The Saturn IB stack consisted of two stages, the booster and an S-IVB stage on top, both of which needed to be fired in order to reach orbit. An S-IVB stage could be modified in a fashion similar to von Braun's original proposals, making a smaller but perfectly usable station. In this case, the equipment would be carried on top of the S-IVB in the location normally reserved for the Lunar Module, but the lack of a large access port meant it would have to remain there instead of being inserted into the tank. Considerable design work along these lines was carried out.

When the later Apollo missions were canceled (18 through 20), a supply of Saturn Vs became available. By this time, so much work had been done on the S-IV-derived system that they decided to continue along those lines instead. The Saturn V delivered enough impulse in its first two stages to place the complete, ground-built station in orbit, and the design was flown as the Skylab "dry workshop".

Another project involving the Apollo-derived wet workshop was the proposed Manned Venus Flyby.

== Shuttle-derived concepts ==
Several similar conversions of the Space Shuttle's external tank (ET) were also studied. During launch the ET accelerated to about 98% of orbital speed before being dropped and deliberately spun in order to increase its drag. A number of proposals suggested keeping the ET attached to the Shuttle all the way into orbit, bleeding off any remaining propellant through the Space Shuttle Main Engines, which would have been "left open". One such test had been scheduled, but was canceled after the 1986 Space Shuttle Challenger disaster dramatically changed safety rules.

The ET would have provided a huge working space, and one major problem with various wet workshop designs is what to do with all of it. The oxygen tank, the smaller of the two tanks inside the ET, was itself much larger than the entire Space Station Freedom. Additionally, getting access to the interior was possible though "manholes" used for inspection during construction, but it was not clear if realistic amounts of building materials could have been inserted into the tank after reaching orbit. Nevertheless, the problem was studied repeatedly.

A similar concept, the "Aft Cargo Carrier", was studied by Martin Marietta in 1984. This consisted of a large cylindrical cargo container bolted onto the bottom of the ET, which offered the same volume as the Space Shuttle orbiter's cargo bay, but would be able to carry wider, bulkier loads. The same basic layout was also used as the basis for a short-duration station design. Although not a wet workshop in the conventional sense, the station piggybacks on the propellant tank and is therefore related to some degree.

== Space Launch System-derived concepts ==
NASA contractor Brand Griffin has proposed to the Marshall Space Flight Center's Advanced Concepts Office the building of a station from a spent Space Launch System hydrogen fuel tank, to be placed at the Earth-Moon L2 Lagrangian point and named Skylab II in honor of the original Skylab.

== Commercial space station application ==
Following its NASA contract and selection for the NextSTEPs Phase II award, NanoRacks developed Independence-1, formerly known as Ixion, a concept for converting spent rocket tanks into habitable living space.
