= Richard Holmes (producer) =

British film producer (born 1963)

Richard Holmes (born 1 January 1963) is a British film producer.

== Career ==
Holmes embarked on his career as part of a comedy duo called The Gruber Brothers, alongside Stefan Schwartz. He later produced Schwartz's acclaimed debut feature film Soft Top Hard Shoulder (1993), written by Peter Capaldi which garnered a BAFTA Scotland for Best Film and Best Actor. award for Best Film and Best Actor. Following this success, he co-wrote and produced Shooting Fish (1997) starring Kate Beckinsale, Stuart Townsend and Dan Futterman.

His next notable production was the multi-award-winning Waking Ned (1998) written and directed by Kirk Jones. For his work on this film, Holmes and his producing partner, Glynis Murray, received a nomination for a Producers Guild of America Award.

Between 1999 and 2002, Holmes served as the managing director of Civilian Content Plc.

In 2008, he collaborated with Christian Colson to produce the critically acclaimed feature film Eden Lake (2008), a horror film written and directed by James Watkins.

His producing work continued in 2011 with the film adaptation of Owen Sheers' novel Resistance, which marked Amit Gupta's directorial debut and starred Andrea Riseborough and Michael Sheen. Sharon Morgan earned a BAFTA Cymru for her performance as Maggie in the film.

Another film produced by Holmes for Gupta, Jadoo, opened the Kulinarisches section of the 2013 Berlinale International Film Festival. The cast included Tom Milson, Harish Patel, Amara Karan, Kulvinder Ghir, Adeel Akhtar and Nikesh Patel.

Later that year, he produced Keeping Rosy, starring Maxine Peake and Blake Harrison. Peake received a Best Actress award at the Fantasporto Film Festival for her role.

From 2013 to 2016 he worked at Creative England and executive produced 45 Years which won multiple awards for Andrew Haigh and actors Charlotte Rampling and Tom Courtenay. He also executive produced The Ecstasy of Wilko Johnson, Orion: The Man Who Would Be King, Notes On Blindness, God's Own Country, Calibre and The Girl with All the Gifts.

In 2017 he produced David Bruckner's debut feature The Ritual based on the novel by Adam Nevill and starring Rafe Spall.

In 2024 he produced Midas Man about the Beatles' former manager Brian Epstein in the film Midas Man starring Jacob Fortune-Lloyd.

In 2025 he produced My Duchess directed by Mike Newell (director) and starring Joan Collins, Isabella Rossellini, Laurent Lafitte, Charles Dance and Miranda Richardson.

He is married to actress Catherine Russell. Together, they have two children, Sam Russell, an improv comedian, co-founder of the improv group Shoot From The Hip, and Poppy Holmes, a music artist.

== Filmography ==
- Soft Top Hard Shoulder (1993) (producer)
- Solitaire For 2 (1995) (producer)
- Shooting Fish (1997) (co-writer, producer)
- Waking Ned (1998) (producer)
- The Jolly Boys' Last Stand (2000) (executive producer)
- Dead Babies (2000) (producer)
- The Abduction Club (2002) (producer)
- Eden Lake (2008) (producer)
- Resistance (2011) (producer)
- Jadoo (2012) (producer)
- Keeping Rosy (2013) (producer)
- 45 Years (2014) (executive producer)
- Orion: The Man Who Would Be King (2015) (executive producer)
- God's Own Country (2017) (executive producer)
- Calibre (film) (2017) (executive producer)
- The Ecstasy of Wilko Johnson (2015) (executive producer)
- The Ritual (2017) (producer)
- Midas Man (2024) (producer)
- The Bitter End (2025) (producer)
