= Michael Morris (director) =

English television director and producer

- Born: London, England
- Occupations: Television and film director and producer
- Years active: 1999–present
- Spouse: Mary McCormack (m. 2003)
- Children: 3

Michael Morris is an English television and film director and producer. He was the director of The Old Vic Theatre in London from 1999 to 2002, and an executive producer and director of the television drama Brothers & Sisters from 2006 to 2011. He has directed episodes of Political Animals, In Plain Sight (starring his wife, actress Mary McCormack), The Slap, Bloodline, Kingdom, Halt and Catch Fire, Preacher, House of Cards, 13 Reasons Why, Shut Eye, and Better Call Saul.

Morris made his feature film directorial debut in 2022 with To Leslie, for which Andrea Riseborough received an Academy Award nomination for Best Actress.

== Personal life ==
Morris has been married to actress Mary McCormack since July 2003. They have three daughters. In October 2013 he was photographed publicly kissing actress Katharine McPhee, whom he had met while directing her in episodes of Smash.

== Filmography ==
Film

- To Leslie (2022)
- Bridget Jones: Mad About the Boy (2025)
- The Nightingale (2027)

TV series

Year	Title	Director	Producer	Notes
2007–2011	Brothers & Sisters	Yes	Yes	Directed 18 episodes; Also supervising producer of 39 episodes
2009–2011	In Plain Sight	Yes	No	Episodes "Don't Cry for Me Albuquerque", "A Priest Walks Into a Bar" and "Something Borrowed, Something Blew Up"
2012	Political Animals	Yes	No	Episode "The Woman Problem"
2012–2013	Smash	Yes	No	7 episodes
2013	Betrayal	Yes	Co-Executive	Directed 2 episodes
2014–2017	Kingdom	Yes	No	11 episodes
2015	The Slap	Yes	No	3 Episodes
2015–2017	Halt and Catch Fire	Yes	No	Episodes "Extract and Defend", "And She Was" and "A Connection Is Made"
2015–2016	Bloodline	Yes	Executive	Directed 3 episodes
2016	Shut Eye	Yes	No	Episode "Two of Swords"
2016–2017	Preacher	Yes	No	Episodes "He Gone" and "Dallas"
2017	House of Cards	Yes	No	Episodes "Chapter 57" and "Chapter 58"
2017	Animal Kingdom	Yes	No	Episode "The Leopard"
2017	Shameless	Yes	No	Episode "God Bless Her Rotting Soul"
2018	Billions	Yes	No	Episode "Not You, Mr. Drake"
2018	13 Reasons Why	Yes	Consulting	Directed 4 episodes
2018–2022	Better Call Saul	Yes	Executive	Episodes "Quite a Ride", "The Guy for This", "Wexler v. Goodman", "Wine and Roses" and "Fun and Games"; Nominated–Primetime Emmy Award for Outstanding Drama Series
