= Mad, Sad & Bad =

2009 British comedy film

- Theatrical film poster
- Directed by: Avie Luthra
- Written by: Avie Luthra
- Produced by: Christine Alderson; Bex Hopkins
- Starring: Meera Syal; Nitin Ganatra; Zubin Varla; Andrea Riseborough; Ayesha Dharker
- Cinematography: Stuart Biddlecombe
- Edited by: Andrea Cuadrado; Liz Roe
- Music by: Mat Davidson
- Release dates: 1 June 2009 (Edinburgh); 31 July 2009 (UK)
- Running time: 90 mins.
- Country: United Kingdom
- Language: English

Mad, Sad & Bad is a 2009 British comedy film directed and written by Avie Luthra. The film stars Meera Syal, Nitin Ganatra, Zubin Varla, Andrea Riseborough, and Ayesha Dharker. It premiered at the Edinburgh International Film Festival in 2009, before a theatrical release throughout the UK the following month.

== Cast ==
- Meera Syal as Rashmi
- Nitin Ganatra as Atul
- Zubin Varla as Hardeep
- Andrea Riseborough as Julia
- Ayesha Dharker as Roxy
- Leena Dhingra as Usha
- Richard Dillane as Roger
- Tony Gardner as Graham
- Gordon Kennedy as Harry
- Les Loveday as Jason
- Jeff Mirza as Dillip
- Zita Sattar as Kirty

== Reception ==
On the review aggregator website Rotten Tomatoes, 29% of 14 critics' reviews are positive, with an average rating of 4.40/10.

Peter Bradshaw of The Guardian gave it 2/5 stars and lamented: "Despite some nice ideas, and an impressive cast, Avie Luthra's family-ensemble movie doesn't entirely come together." Wally Hammond of Time Out, in a mixed review, opined that: "A disconcerting fluctuation in tone – from sorrowful satire to cheesy sitcom – proves the film's fatal flaw."

Cosmo Landesman of The Sunday Times awarded it 1/5 stars and chided the film: "Like a sitcom pilot that should never have seen the light of day. The characters are cardboard cutouts and the comedy lacks bite." Jamie Russell of Total Film also scored it 1/5 stars and derided: "Another underachieving comedy to file and forget in British cinema's already overstuffed bottom drawer. Yawn."

But Derek Malcolm of The London Evening Standard rated it 3/5 stars and lauded the cast's performances: "Luthra extracts good performances from his cast (Meera Syal, Nitin Ganatra, et al.) and his writing gives them something to do once the story gets going." Sukhdev Sandhu of The Daily Telegraph praised the filmmaker: "Luthra possesses a contrary sensibility that makes me curious to see what he comes up with next."
