= Sharon Morgan =

Welsh actress

- Born: Sharon Haf Morgan; 29 August 1949 (age 77); Llandyfaelog, Carmarthenshire, Wales
- Education: Cardiff University
- Occupations: Film, television and stage actress
- Years active: 1977–present
- Height: 1.65 m (5 ft 5 in)
- Children: 2

Sharon Morgan (born 29 August 1949) is a Welsh actress of stage and screen, currently based in Cardiff. She was brought up in the village of Llandyfaelog. She is best known for her work within the Welsh film and television industries and has been the recipient of three BAFTA Cymru awards.

== Personal life ==
Morgan grew up in Glanamman, Carmarthenshire, the daughter of a headmaster and a drama teacher. In her youth she did not believe she could succeed as an actress, but states that her parents always supported her career choice. As a back up to her desired acting career, Morgan studied an undergraduate history course at Cardiff University in the 1960s, before training to be a stage actress. Morgan has two children, Steffan (born 1979/1980) and Saran (born 1995/1996) and spent the largest part of her acting career juggling her work and life as a single parent. Speaking of her difficult home/work balance Morgan elaborates that "You manage with the help of friends. You find a way". A Welsh language campaigner, Morgan was arrested in 1988 for daubing paint on the Welsh Office. The actress was afraid that this criminal conviction may have precluded her from gaining a US Visa to film Torchwood in Los Angeles.

Morgan is trilingual, speaking Welsh – her mother tongue – English and French. Morgan is an advocate for remaining active in old age, and cites fellow actress Helen Mirren as an inspiration to older women.

== Career ==
Since beginning her acting career in the 1970s, Morgan has appeared in a variety of TV series, films and stage productions in both the English and Welsh languages. Welsh Newspaper the Western Mail referred to her as "one of the most respected actors of her generation." Notable roles include her portrayal of Professor Margaret Edwards in A Mind to Kill between 1994 and 2002, and portraying Stella Craven in Mine All Mine, (2004) written by Russell T Davies.

Amongst Morgan's other screen credits are a regular lead role in the BBC drama series Belonging, as well as a semi-regular role in Doctors and appearances in other UK television shows such as Midsomer Murders, Casualty, Coronation Street, Caerdydd, Pobol y Cwm and Alys. In 2002 Morgan appeared as Kath, a frustrated middle-aged housewife in the Cardiff-shot comedy short Pleasure Pill. She played the lead role of Martha in the 2008 S4C drama Martha, Jac a Sianco which she describes as a "culturally important film" that serves as "a strong and sensitive portrayal of agricultural life in Wales". Morgan's portrayal of Martha won her her second BAFTA Cymru award for best actress (having previously won one for her performance in Tair Chwaer [1998]).

Morgan has also achieved prominence through her role in Torchwood as Mary Cooper, the mother of principal character Gwen Cooper. Morgan first appeared in the episode "Something Borrowed" in the second series (2008), and returned for six episodes of the show's fourth series, Torchwood: Miracle Day (2011). Later in 2011, Morgan starred as Maggie Jones in Resistance, an adaptation of the novel of the same name by Owen Sheers. Morgan's work on Resistance earned her a further best actress nomination at the 21st BAFTA Cymru awards; she went on to win the award in a ceremony held on 30 September 2012. In September 2012 Morgan joined the cast of the fifth series of Hollyoaks Later, playing Nana Flo. She will also star in the upcoming U.S drama series Da Vinci's Demons as Sister Albina.

In addition to her screen career, Morgan is also an established stage actress and dramatist who has also translated plays, including the Vagina Monologues, into the Welsh language. Her stage acting roles include the National Theatre Wales production A Good night out in the Valleys which was first performed in 2010.

== Selected filmography ==
| Year(s) | Title | Role | More information |
|---|---|---|---|
| 2025 | The One That Got Away | Delyth Lloyd | |
| 2025 | Casualty | Anne Knight | |
| 2025 | Out There | Gwen Thomas | |
| 2023 | Kestav | Jenna Gwennap | A short film in Kernewek (with her daughter Saran) |
| 2018–2021 | Pobol y Cwm | Brenda Parri | Series regular |
| 2018 | Apostle | "Her" | Feature Film |
| 2014 | Evermoor | Esmerelda Dwyer | Recurring Character |
| 2012 | Da Vinci's Demons | Sister Albina | |
| 2012 | Hollyoaks Later | Nana Flo | Series five |
| 2011 | Resistance | Maggie Jones | Won - Bafta Cymru award for Best Actress |
| 2011 | Alys (TV series) | Lisabeth | Three episodes: Pennod Five; Pennod Six; Pennod Seven |
| 2008–2011 | Torchwood | Mary Cooper | 7 episodes |
| 2008 | Martha, Jac a Sianco | Martha | Won Bafta Cymru award for Best Actress |
| 2008 | After You've Gone | Beryl | TV episode: "Going Solo" |
| 2007 | Midsomer Murders | Delyth Mostyn | TV episode: "Death and Dust" |
| 2006 | Caerdydd | Anne Davies | Two episodes |
| 2006 | High Hopes | Professor Blunt | Two episodes |
| 2006 | Calon Gaeth | Aunt Hetty | Welsh TV film |
| 2005–2007 | Doctors | Gwyneth Powis | Recurring character |
| 2005 | Mabel | Janice | Film short |
| 2005 | Down to Earth | Rita Powell | TV episode: "Say Hello, Wave Goodbye" |
| 2004 | Mine All Mine | Stella Craven | Lead Role |
| 2004 | Pobol y Cwm | Sylvia Bevan | One-off appearance |
| 2002 | Pleasure Pill | Kath | Comedy Short; Lead Role |
| 1994 | Gadael Lenin | Eileen | feature Film |
| 1994–2002 | A Mind to Kill | Professor Margaret Edwards, pathologist | Series regular |
| 1992 | Casualty | Jean Collins | TV episode: "Cascade" |
| 1986 | No Place Like Home | Daphne Davies | TV episode: "Trevor's Last Stand" |
| 1986 | That Uncertain Feeling | Dentist's mistress | 4 episodes |
| 1984–1987 | Pobol y Cwm | Sylvia Bevan | Series regular |
| 1984 | The Magnificent Evans | Rachel Harris | Leading role (six episodes) |
| 1983 | The Gentle Touch | Carrie Harrison | TV episode: "Private Views" |
| 1982 | Giro City | Social Worker | Feature film |
| 1979 | Coronation Street | Mrs Ellis | One off appearance |
| 1979 | Thomas & Sarah | Alice Williams | TV episode: "Made in Heaven" |
| 1978 | Pobol y Cwm | Sian Jones | 7 episodes |
| 1978 | Grand Slam | Odette | Television film |
