= Jadoo (2013 film) =

- Film poster
- Directed by: Amit Gupta
- Written by: Amit Gupta
- Produced by: Amanda Faber; Isabelle Georgeaux; Nikki Parrot; Richard Holmes
- Starring: Amara Karan; Harish Patel; Kulvinder Ghir; Tom Mison; Ray Panthaki; Madhur Jaffrey
- Cinematography: Roger Pratt
- Edited by: Eddie Hamilton
- Music by: Stephen Warbeck
- Release date: 6 September 2013
- Country: United Kingdom
- Language: English

Jadoo is a 2013 food-feud family comedy film set in Leicester, released in cinemas on 6 September 2013. It is written and directed by filmmaker Amit Gupta. It tells the story of two brothers, Raja and Jagi, who are both chefs, but fall out catastrophically. They set up rival restaurants, on opposite sides of The Golden Mile in Belgrave, Leicester; one cooking starters and the other main courses, and refuse to talk to one another. Raja's daughter Shalini, attempts to get the brothers talking again. She hatches a plan and asks them to work together to cook her a perfect Indian wedding banquet.

== Plot ==
Two brothers, both wonderful chefs, fall out catastrophically. At the climax of their dispute they rip the family recipe book in half – one brother gets the starters and the other gets the main courses. They set up rival restaurants, on opposite sides of the same road, and spend the next twenty years trying to outdo each other. Neither brother will admit it but they both know they are not entirely successful without the 'other half' of the menu. It takes Raja's daughter, Shalini, a successful London lawyer, marrying a man from a different ethnic background, to reunite them. She is planning her marriage and is determined that they will both attend. Can the men bury the hatchet without actually burying the kitchen knife?

Shalini returns home to Leicester for the Hindu festival of Holi to tell her father and her uncle that she's getting married. But it takes a challenge from a sharp ambitious new restaurant owner who tries to put them out of business and a threat from Shalini that she will not have a traditional Indian wedding before the brothers finally start to unravel the secret behind the quarrel which has lasted two decades.

== Cast ==
- Amara Karan as Shalini
- Harish Patel as Raja
- Kulvinder Ghir as Jagi
- Tom Mison as Mark
- Ray Panthaki as Rak Sharma
- Madhur Jaffrey as herself
- Ravi Morjaria as himself

== Production ==
The co-writer, director and producers of Resistance brought their team to Leicester, UK, to shoot Jadoo. Amara Karan plays Shalini. Oscar-nominated cinematographer Roger Pratt (The End of the Affair) has returned to his hometown to shoot the film, while Eddie Hamilton edited the film.

== Reception ==
Jadoo was not warmly received by David Gritten of The Daily Telegraph; he concluded that it was "dreadfully predictable". Roger Pratt's cinematography was praised, with the film being described as "ravishingly photographed".

== Awards ==
Jadoo was voted as the 2014 RAGS Audience Award Winner at the Silk Screen Film Festival held in Pittsburgh, PA.
