= Coleshill Auxiliary Research Team =

Network of British historians

Coleshill Auxiliary Research Team (CART) is a network of British historians. It is named after Coleshill in Oxfordshire where Winston Churchill had arranged for groups of soldiers, called Auxiliary Units, to develop and be trained in guerrilla war tactics for use in the event of a Nazi invasion of England during World War II. CART is the largest group in the UK researching this force and have put together a national database listing the 3,500 men.

Conservative MP Justin Tomlinson has said of CART, "I fully support CART’s mission to honour their bravery. Their vital work should remain secret no longer."
