= My Duchess =

British drama film

- Theatrical release poster
- Directed by: Mike Newell
- Screenplay by: Louise Fennell
- Produced by: John Gore; Richard Holmes; Francis Hopkinson
- Starring: Joan Collins; Isabella Rossellini
- Cinematography: Mike Eley
- Production company: John Gore Studios
- Distributed by: Icon Film Distribution
- Release dates: 28 October 2026 (British Film Festival - Australia); 5 February 2027 (United Kingdom)
- Running time: 94 minutes
- Country: United Kingdom
- Language: English

My Duchess is a 2026 British biographical drama film based on the later years of Wallis Simpson. It was directed by Mike Newell, and stars Joan Collins and Isabella Rossellini.

== Premise ==
The film documents the later years in the life of Wallis Simpson.

== Cast ==
- Joan Collins as Wallis Simpson
- Isabella Rossellini as Suzanne Blum
- Buom Tihngang as Louis
- Miranda Richardson as Lady Diana Mosley
- Charles Dance as Lord Mountbatten
- Laurent Lafitte as Jean-Claude de Montalbon
- Yves Heck as Antoine
- Roxane Duran as Marianna
- Jill Baker as Lady Monckton
- Lambert Wilson as General Georges Spillman
- Philippe Spall as Dr. D'Ath
- Richard Meek as Daisy
- David Langham as Chou Chou
- David Bamber as Sir Godfrey Morley
- Junior Bear Pug as Wallis Simpson's pug

== Production ==
The film is written by Louise Fennell and directed by Mike Newell. It is produced by John Gore, Richard Holmes and Francis Hopkinson for John Gore Studios. It was originally titled In Bed with the Duchess and The Bitter End.

The film charts the final years of Wallis Simpson, the American divorcee who became the Duchess of Windsor after marrying the former King Edward VIII, the British King who chose love over duty.

The cast features Joan Collins as Wallis Simpson and also includes Isabella Rossellini as Suzanne Blum, a French lawyer and confidante of Simpson. Speaking to The Guardian, Collins said she took the role at the age of 91 because it had "a very good script and it’s a great part for me. I've always been fascinated by Wallis, because I think she was unfairly treated".

Principal photography began in May 2025 in London and the South-East of England. That same month, Miranda Richardson, Charles Dance, Laurent Lafitte, Buom Tihngang, Yves Heck, Roxane Duran, Jill Baker, Lambert Wilson, Philippe Spall, Richard Meek, David Langham, and David Bamber joined the cast.

My Duchess is executive produced by Hilary Strong, Michael Foster and Percy Gibson. It also marks the first production to shoot on the historic stages of Ealing Studios following its recent expansion and renovation.

== Release ==
The film premiered at the 2026 Russell Hobbs British Film Festival in Australia on 28 October 2026, and is scheduled to be released theatrically in the United Kingdom on 5 February 2027, by Icon Film Distribution.
