= To Leslie =

- Theatrical release poster
- Directed by: Michael Morris
- Written by: Ryan Binaco
- Produced by: Claude Dal Farra; Brian Keady; Kelsey Law; Philip Waley; Jason Shuman; Eduardo Cisneros
- Starring: Andrea Riseborough; Andre Royo; Owen Teague; Stephen Root; James Landry Hébert; Marc Maron; Allison Janney
- Cinematography: Larkin Seiple
- Edited by: Chris McCaleb
- Music by: Linda Perry
- Production companies: BlueWater Lane Productions; Jason Shuman Productions; Eduardo Cisneros Productions; BCDF Pictures; Clair de Lune Entertainment; Baral Waley Productions
- Distributed by: Momentum Pictures
- Release dates: March 12, 2022 (SXSW); October 7, 2022 (United States)
- Running time: 119 minutes
- Country: United States
- Language: English
- Budget: <$1 million
- Box office: $413,158

To Leslie is a 2022 American drama film directed by Michael Morris in his feature directorial debut, and written by Ryan Binaco. The film stars Andrea Riseborough as Leslie Rowland, a single mother and alcoholic who squanders all the prize money she received after winning the lottery. She soon finds the chance to redeem herself when a motel owner offers her a job. Allison Janney, Marc Maron, Andre Royo, Owen Teague, and Stephen Root are featured in supporting roles.

To Leslie premiered at South by Southwest on March 12, 2022 and was given a limited release on October 7, 2022 by Momentum Pictures. The film received critical acclaim, with Riseborough's performance garnering widespread praise and a nomination for the Academy Award for Best Actress.

== Plot ==
Leslie is a troubled and manipulative alcoholic from West Texas who won $190,000 in a local lottery, only to squander the winnings on liquor and drugs. Six years later, Leslie is destitute, living a peripatetic life in motels and on the streets. After being kicked out of a residential motel, she reunites with her estranged 19-year-old son James, who allows her to live with him under the provision that she not drink. Leslie soon steals money from James's roommate Darren, and James discovers liquor bottles under her bed, leading him to call his grandmother and Leslie's friend Nancy for help.

Nancy and her boyfriend Dutch reluctantly allow Leslie to stay with them, but lock her out in the middle of the night when she visits the local bar and is spotted by Pete, one of their friends. Leslie sleeps outside next to a motel, where she is found at dawn by Sweeney, one of the proprietors. He orders her to leave, and she flees, leaving her suitcase behind. She is met outside a convenience store that night by Pete, who buys her food, but Leslie again flees when he attempts to make sexual advances toward her.

Leslie returns to the motel in search of her suitcase, and Sweeney pretends to confuse her for somebody who had called for a job, and offers her the opportunity of cleaning rooms in exchange for a small wage and boarding. Royal, who owns and helps run the motel with Sweeney, is cold toward Leslie, whom he has known since childhood. Leslie is frequently unpunctual to her duties, and she continues to spend her earnings on alcohol, often going to bars. Late one night, Leslie drunkenly wanders to the home where she raised James, startling the family who now lives there. The homeowners phone Sweeney, who returns Leslie to the roadhouse.

Disappointed by Leslie's lack of commitment, Sweeney intends to fire her, but he relents when she assures him she intends to change her ways. With nowhere left to turn, Leslie attempts to focus on her job and maintain sobriety as she suffers through alcohol withdrawal. Leslie and Sweeney develop a friendship, bonding over their mutual history of addiction. Leslie accompanies Sweeney to a fair, where she meets his daughter and granddaughter. Leslie gets into a confrontation with Nancy at the fair, who lambasts her in front of Sweeney for having abandoned James when he was a child.

Later that day, she argues with Sweeney after he insists on watching a VHS tape containing the TV news piece on her lottery win. On the tape, the teenage James mentions that Leslie has always wanted to open a diner and the younger Leslie, clearly drunk, scoffs. She quits her job at the motel. She phones James from a laundromat, leaving a message telling him she loves him. She then visits her usual bar, where she is hit on by a handsome but roguish younger man. She orders a beer and a shot, but decides not to drink either. Meanwhile, Sweeney searches for Leslie and arrives at the bar, but she has left. He punches and tussles with Pete after he and Nancy insult Leslie. Leslie squats in an abandoned ice cream shop across the street from the motel and watches as Sweeney returns. In the morning, she awakens Sweeney and tells him she wants to renovate the ice cream shop and open a diner. He reluctantly agrees to help and they kiss for the first time.

Ten months later, Leslie is sober, and with Sweeney and Royal's help, she has fixed up the building and turned it into a diner. On opening day, Leslie receives no customers. Nancy arrives that evening at closing time, and Leslie accuses her of sabotaging the business's opening by telling the locals not to go. Instead of responding with rage, Nancy apologizes to Leslie for not being emotionally present throughout Leslie's life, while also stating that she won't ever forgive Leslie for abandoning her son due to her addiction. Nancy also surprises Leslie by revealing she has brought James with her. Royal and Sweeney prepare a meal for them, and the two embrace.

== Cast ==
- Andrea Riseborough as Leslie "Lee" Rowland
- Allison Janney as Nancy
- Marc Maron as Sweeney
- Andre Royo as Royal
- Owen Teague as James
- Stephen Root as Dutch
- James Landry Hébert as Pete
- Catfish Jean as Darren
- Scott Subiono as Rancher Glen
- Blake Robbins as The Handyman
- Matt Lauria as Handsome Outlaw

== Production ==
In July 2019, it was announced Andrea Riseborough had joined the cast of the film, with Michael Morris directing from a screenplay by Ryan Binaco. In June 2020, Allison Janney and John Hawkes joined the cast of the film. In December 2020, Marc Maron and Stephen Root joined the cast of the film, with Maron replacing Hawkes. The film was shot in Los Angeles over the course of 19 days during the COVID-19 pandemic, on a budget of less than $1 million. Music supervisor Linda Perry wrote the original song "Angels Are Falling", which is performed by Patty Griffin, for the film. Principal photography began on October 12, 2020.

== Release ==
The film had its world premiere at South by Southwest on March 12, 2022. In September 2022, Momentum Pictures acquired distribution rights to the film, giving it a limited theatrical and on-demand streaming release on October 7, 2022. Following the announcement of Riseborough's Oscar nomination, the film was re-released to six theaters, making an estimated $2,500 to $5,000 over the January 27–29 weekend. The movie was picked up by Netflix in the United States for streaming on June 1, 2023.

== Reception ==
=== Critical reception ===
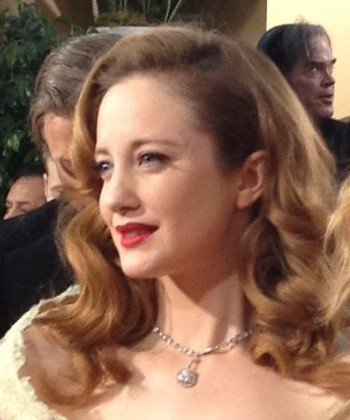
Andrea Riseborough garnered critical acclaim for her performance and earned an Academy Award nomination for Best Actress.

On the review aggregator website Rotten Tomatoes, 93% of 103 critics' reviews are positive, with an average rating of 7.6/10. The website's consensus reads: "To Leslie's familiar framework is granted extra depth through a stellar Andrea Riseborough and a sensitive and nuanced approach to the cycle of addiction." Metacritic, which uses a weighted average, assigned the film a score of 84 out of 100, based on 19 critics, indicating "universal acclaim".

Richard Roeper from the Chicago Sun-Times gave the film a perfect 4 out of 4 star rating, and wrote: "Every character in To Leslie feels 'lived-in.' Every scene rings true, sometimes in surprising ways." He also singled out Riseborough's performance as "one of the great portrayals of alcoholism in a miniature masterpiece of quietly powerful dialogue." Owen Gleiberman, writing for Variety, stated: "Riseborough's performance is nothing short of spectacular. She doesn't compromise, she doesn't hold back, but she doesn't endow the character with any sort of fake flamboyance."

The New York Times praised Riseborough's "deft performance" as Leslie, and described the film as a "deceptively simple yet heart-wrenching character study." The Hollywood Reporter called the film "a stirring character study" that "recalls the grit of 1970s American indie cinema at its most indelible," and praised Riseborough's performance: "Leslie is played to riveting perfection by Andrea Riseborough, who appears in nearly every scene and delivers a performance that's extraordinary in its moment-to-moment sparks of hope against hope and slow-dawning self-awareness amid the despair, dissembling and self-delusion."

In his review of the film following Riseborough's Oscar nomination, Peter Travers stated: "Riseborough's portrayal of addiction is unmatched since Nicolas Cage won an Oscar for Leaving Las Vegas." "Whether or not Riseborough pulls off a longshot victory at the Oscars, she's created a portrayal that plays like a classic country song you can't get out of your head and heart. In a movie rescued from oblivion, Riseborough is unmissable and unforgettable."

== Accolades ==
Award ceremony	Date of ceremony	Category	Recipient	Result	Ref.
Academy Awards	March 12, 2023	Best Actress	Andrea Riseborough	Nominated	
Capri Hollywood International Film Festival Awards	January 2, 2023	Capri Special Award for Best Feature Film	Michael Morris	Won	
Chicago Film Critics Association Awards	December 14, 2022	Best Actress	Andrea Riseborough	Nominated	
Chlotrudis Awards	March 19, 2023	Best Actress	Andrea Riseborough	Nominated	
Chlotrudis Awards	March 19, 2023	Best Supporting Actress	Allison Janney	Nominated	
Gijón International Film Festival Awards	November 19, 2022	Best Actor	Marc Maron	Won	
Gijón International Film Festival Awards	November 19, 2022	Best Actress	Andrea Riseborough	Won	
Independent Spirit Awards	March 4, 2023	Best Lead Performance	Andrea Riseborough	Nominated	
National Board of Review Awards	January 8, 2023	Top Ten Independent Films	To Leslie	Placed	
Raindance Film Festival Awards	November 4, 2022	Film of the Festival	Michael Morris	Won	
Raindance Film Festival Awards	November 4, 2022	Best Performance	Andrea Riseborough	Won	

=== Best Actress Oscar nomination ===
As Momentum Pictures did not fund a conventional, advertising-driven awards campaign for the film, director Michael Morris and his wife, actress Mary McCormack, organized a "celeb-backed campaign" to get Riseborough nominated for the Academy Award for Best Actress. They contacted friends and colleagues in the entertainment industry, asking them to view the film and share it with others if they enjoyed it. Morris and Riseborough also hired publicists to coordinate the efforts. While theretofore not widely seen or regarded as a serious awards contender, the campaign successfully raised the film's profile as dozens of celebrities publicly praised it and Riseborough's performance on social media; some also hosted screenings during voting for the Academy Award nominations in January 2023. Riseborough was nominated for the award on January 24, which the Los Angeles Times called "one of the most shocking nominations in Oscar history".

After the nomination was announced, there was speculation within the media and the film industry that the tactics may have violated an Academy of Motion Picture Arts and Sciences rule against directly lobbying voters. Academy rules forbid individuals from giving "their personal signature, personal regards, or pleas to watch the film" in campaign-related communications. A post on the film's Instagram account was also subject to criticism, for possibly violating an Academy rule against "[singling] out 'the competition' by name"; the post featured a quote from film critic Richard Roeper, who praised Riseborough's performance as better than Cate Blanchett's in Tár, a fellow nominee for Best Actress. On January 27, the Academy announced that they were "conducting a review of the campaign procedures around this year's nominees, to ensure that no guidelines were violated, and to inform us whether changes to the guidelines may be needed in a new era of social media and digital communication".

The campaign was also pointed out to have identical phrasing from multiple individuals which resulted in internet memes; Riseborough's campaign was also seen to harm chances in regards to additional nominations for women of color, namely for Danielle Deadwyler and Viola Davis, who typically do not have the widespread push Riseborough received during voting (both actresses were eventually not nominated in favor for Riseborough with Michelle Yeoh as the only woman of color nominated in the category).

The Academy occasionally rescinds nominations if it is found that the nominee participated in unsanctioned campaigning. However, there were no reports that Riseborough had done so, or that any Academy members had lodged formal complaints about the campaign's behavior; consequently, Clayton Davis of Variety and Pete Hammond of Deadline Hollywood both predicted that the nomination would be unaffected. On January 31, the Academy concluded its review by pledging to address "social media and outreach campaigning tactics" which they said caused "concern", but confirming that Riseborough's nomination would be retained.
