= Auxiliary Units =

British stay-behind units in the Second World War

The Auxiliary Units, Home Guard Shock Squads or GHQ Auxiliary Units were specially trained, highly secret quasi military units created by the British government during the Second World War with the aim of using irregular warfare in response to a possible invasion of the United Kingdom by Nazi Germany. With the advantage of having witnessed the rapid fall of several Continental European nations, the United Kingdom was the only country during the war that was able to create a guerrilla force in anticipation of an invasion.

Auxiliary Units relied on pre-prepared bunkers known as "operational bases", into which they were to disappear in the event of invasion. They would not maintain contact with local Home Guard commanders, who were to be wholly unaware of their existence. Auxiliaries would not participate in the conventional phase of their town's defence, but would be activated once the local Home Guard defence had been ended to inflict maximum mayhem and disruption over a further brief but violent period. They were not envisaged as a continuing resistance force against long-term occupation. The secrecy surrounding the insurgent squads meant that members "had no military status, no uniforms and there are very few official records of their activities".

Service in the Auxiliary Units was expected to be highly dangerous, with a projected life expectancy of just twelve days for its members, with orders to either shoot one another or use explosives to kill themselves if capture by an enemy force seemed likely.

Urged on by the War Office, Prime Minister Winston Churchill initiated the Auxiliary Units in the early summer of 1940. This was to counter the civilian Home Defence Scheme already established by SIS (MI6), but outside War Office control. The Auxiliary Units answered to GHQ Home Forces but were legally an integral part of the Home Guard.

In modern times, the Auxiliary Units have sometimes misleadingly been referred to as the "British Resistance Organisation". That title was never used by the organisation officially but reflects a subsequent misunderstanding of what their role might have been. Colloquially, members of the Auxiliary Units were referred to as "scallywags" and their activities as "scallywagging".

== Beginnings ==
Section D, a sabotage and resistance unit which was part of MI6, began recruiting personnel and accumulating arms and equipment in mid-June, 1940. This roused suspicion among the military authorities, and General Ironside, the C-in-C of GHQ Home Forces, insisted that all guerrilla and sabotage organisations be subject to military control. Colonel Colin Gubbins was the obvious choice to command the new organisation. Gubbins was a regular British Army soldier who had acquired considerable experience and expertise in guerrilla warfare during the Allied intervention in the Russian Civil War in 1919 and in the Irish War of Independence of 1919–1921. From early 1939, he had served with MI R, another guerrilla organisation controlled by the War Office. Most recently, he had returned from the Norwegian campaign, where he headed the Independent Companies, the predecessors of the British Commandos, before succeeding to the acting command of a Guards brigade. He later wrote:

I had, in fact, been given a blank cheque, but was there any money in the bank to meet it? Everything would have to be improvised. Time was of the essence ... at the shortest we had six weeks before a full-scale invasion could be launched; if we were lucky, we might have until October, after which climatic conditions would give us a respite ...

Gubbins used several officers who had served with the Independent Companies in Norway and others whom he had known there. Units were localised on a county structure, as they would probably be fragmented and isolated from one another. They were distributed around the coast rather than being countrywide, with priority being given to the counties most at risk from enemy invasion, the two most vulnerable being Kent and Sussex in South East England. The two best known officers from the period are Captain Peter Fleming of the Grenadier Guards and Captain Mike Calvert of the Royal Engineers.

== Operational Patrols ==
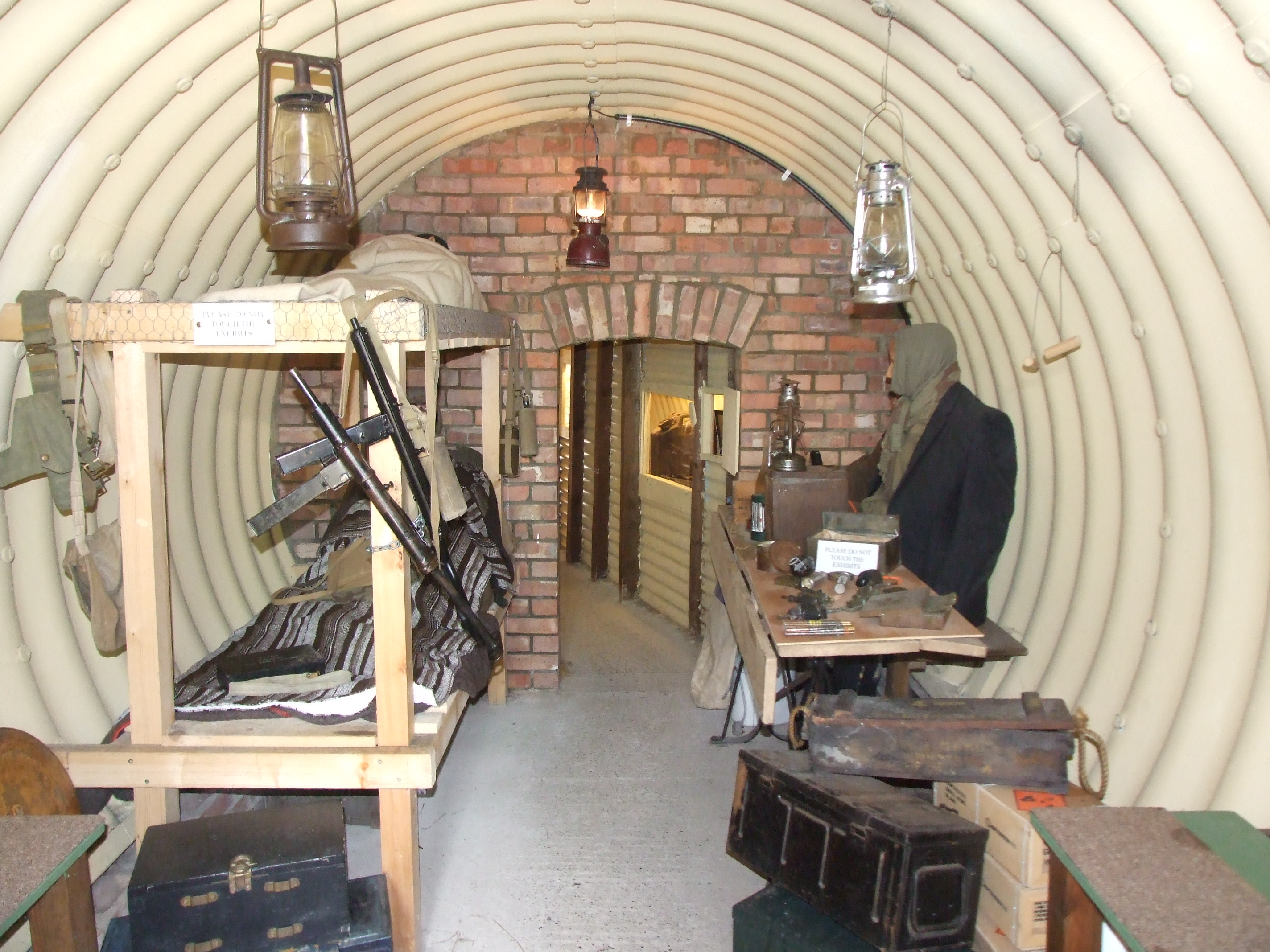
Operational Base reconstruction at Parham Airfield Museum, Suffolk

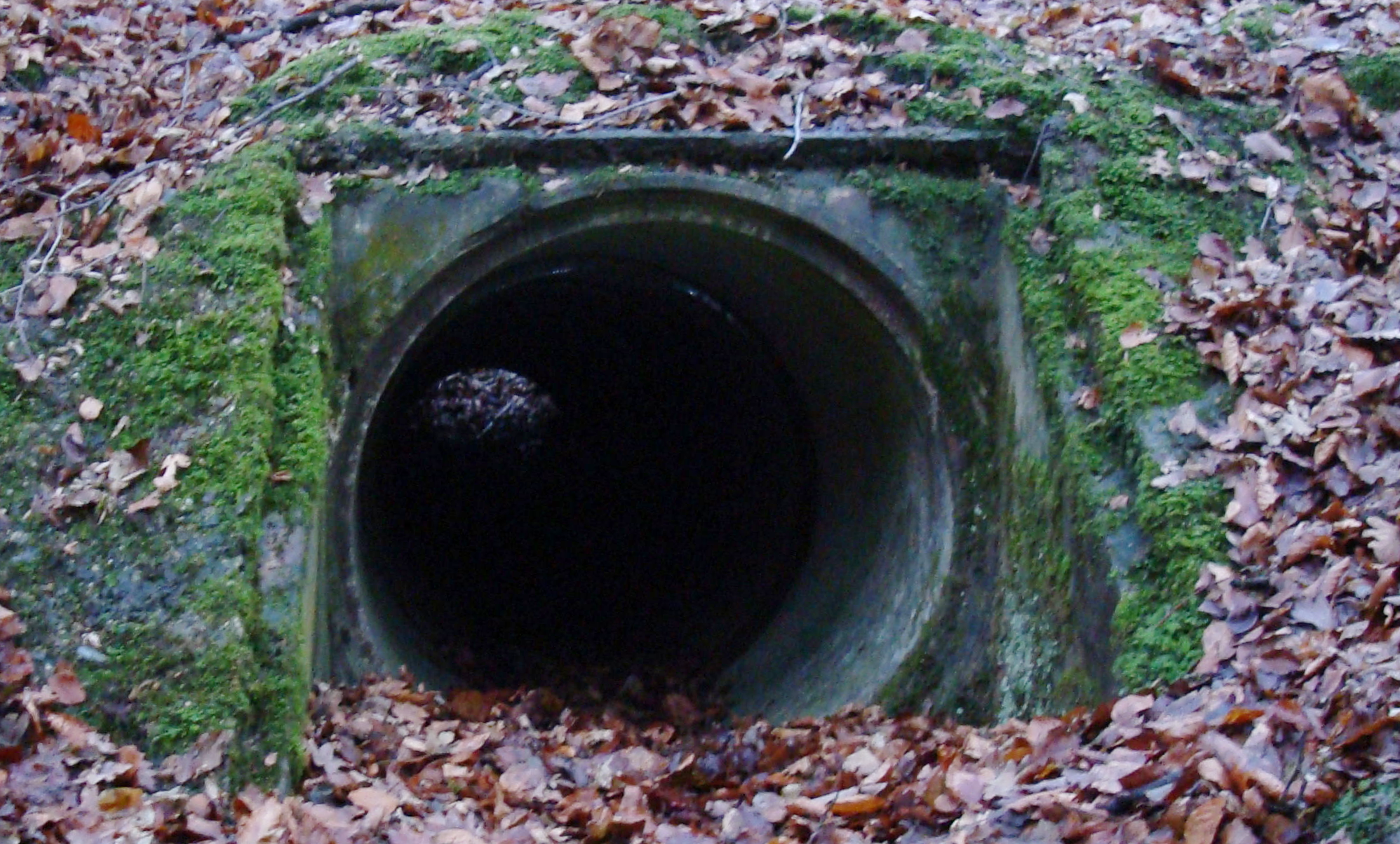
Auxiliary Units, Operational Base, emergency exit

Operational Patrols consisted of between four and eight men, often farmers or landowners. They were usually recruited from the most able members of the Home Guard, possessed excellent local knowledge and were able to live off the land. Gamekeepers and even poachers were particularly valued. They were always intended to fight in Home Guard uniform and from 1942 the men were badged to Home Guard battalions 201 (Scotland), 202 (northern England), or 203 (southern England).

Around 3,500 men were trained on weekend courses at Coleshill House, near Highworth, Wiltshire, in the arts of guerrilla warfare including assassination, unarmed combat, demolition and sabotage.

Each Patrol was a self-contained cell, expected to be self-sufficient and operationally autonomous in the case of invasion, generally operating within a 15-mile radius. They were provided with elaborately concealed underground Operational Bases (AUOB / OB), usually built by the Royal Engineers in a local woodland, with a camouflaged entrance and emergency escape tunnel. It is thought that 400 to 500 such OBs were constructed in England, Wales and Scotland.

Some Patrols had an additional concealed Observation Post and/or underground ammunition store. Patrols were provided with a selection of the latest weapons, including a silenced pistol or Sten gun and Fairbairn–Sykes "commando" knives, quantities of plastic explosive, incendiary devices, and food to last for two weeks. Members anticipated being shot if they were captured, and were expected to shoot themselves first rather than be taken alive.

The mission of the units was to attack invading forces from behind their own lines while conventional forces fell back to prepared defences. Aircraft, fuel dumps, railway lines, and depots were high on the list of targets, as would be the assassination of senior German officers and any local collaborators. Patrols secretly reconnoitred local country houses, which might be used by German officers, and prepared lists of suspected fifth columnists as early targets for killing.

Although the Auxiliary Units would fight in Home Guard uniform, they would otherwise clearly be irregular combatants under the Geneva Conventions. They and their weapons would be concealed, they would not be under the control of the local Home Guard commander, and they would not be constrained by the 'rules of war' in combat. General Home Guard units were instructed to fight on and not to surrender, but it was expected that nevertheless, once their ammunition was exhausted, they would have to give themselves up to capture. That was seen as creating an opportunity for a hidden Auxiliary Unit in the locality to kill as many Germans as possible just when they might be considering themselves as victors.

== Special Duty Sections and Signals ==
Separate from the Auxiliary Units' Operational Patrols was the Special Duty Branch, which was originally recruited by SIS and carefully vetted and selected from the local civilian population. It acted as "eyes and ears" and would report back to military intelligence any information that it heard from 'careless talk' or from watching troop movements and supply routes. It was supported by a signals network of hidden, short-range, wireless sets around the coast. The structure allowed no means to pass on such information to the Operational Patrols.

It is unlikely that the wireless network would survive long after invasion and that it would not have been possible to link the isolated Operational Patrols into a national network that could act in concert on behalf of a British government in exile and its representatives still in the United Kingdom. Instead, SIS (MI6) created a separate resistance organisation (Section VII) with powerful wireless sets that was intended to act on a longer-term basis.

The Special Duties Sections were recruited largely from the civilian population, with around 4,000 members. They had been trained to identify vehicles, high-ranking officers and military units and were to gather intelligence and leave reports in dead letter drops. The reports would be collected by runners and taken to one of over 200 secret radio transmitters operated by trained civilian signals staff. The civilian personnel operated as 'Intelligence Gatherers' and operated the OUT Station radios. ATS subalterns or Royal Signals personnel operated the Special Duties IN-Stations and Zero Stations.

== Later history ==
In November 1940, Gubbins moved to the Special Operations Executive (SOE), which had incorporated Section D and MI R, as its Director of Operations.

The Auxiliary Units were kept in being long after any immediate German threat had passed and were stood down only in November 1944. Several Auxiliary Unit members later joined the Special Air Service. Many men saw action in the campaign in France in late 1944, notably in Operation Houndsworth and Operation Bulbasket.

From 1942, the Operational Patrols of the Auxiliary Units tried to reinvent themselves as an anti-raiding force. That was primarily a device to avoid them from being disbanded, as the War Office had made a promise that the volunteers would not be returned to normal Home Guard duties. They therefore had to be kept in existence until the general stand-down of the Home Guard. Nonetheless, some units were deployed to the Isle of Wight prior to the D day landings in 1944 to help protect the Pluto fuel pipeline from being attacked by German commandos. It was then suggested that the Auxiliary Units should be fully administered by the Home Guard, but that was not enacted before the final stand-down in November 1944.

== Cultural references ==
An Auxiliary Unit arms cache features in the 1985 BBC TV series, Blott on the Landscape.

British partisans feature in two UK films that imagine what would have happened if Germany had successfully invaded Britain: the 1966 film It Happened Here (which simply refers to 'partisans') and the 2011 film Resistance based on Owen Sheers' first novel, Resistance. The partisans in the latter are loosely based upon Auxiliary Units, albeit with considerable artistic licence.

The Auxiliary Units feature in the BBC TV series Wartime Farm although there is some confusion between the roles of the Operational Patrols and the Special Duties Branch.

The Auxiliary Units and Special Duties Branch feature heavily in Gordon Stevens' 1991 novel And All the King's Men (ISBN 978-0330315340). The novel examines an alternate history following a successful German invasion of England.

== See also ==
- Military history of the United Kingdom during World War II
- British anti-invasion preparations of the Second World War
- Military history of the United Kingdom
- Special forces
- Stay-behind
- Clandestine cell system
- Hypothetical Axis victory in World War II
- Coleshill Auxiliary Research Team
- Volunteer Defence Corps (Australia)
- List of paramilitary organizations
