= What Remains (2022 international film) =

2022 international mystery film

- Theatrical film poster
- Finnish: Mitä jäljelle jää
- Directed by: Ran Huang
- Written by: Megan Everett-Skarsgård; Ran Huang
- Produced by: Jessica Chen; Ran Huang; Ying Liang; Qinshu Zuo
- Starring: Andrea Riseborough; Gustaf Skarsgård; Stellan Skarsgård
- Cinematography: Christopher Blauvelt
- Music by: Ben Frost
- Release dates: October 14, 2022 (Warsaw); June 21, 2024 (USA); July 12, 2024 (Finland)
- Running time: 126 minutes
- Countries: China; Finland; United Kingdom; United States
- Language: English

What Remains (Finnish: Mitä jäljelle jää) is a 2022 international mystery crime drama thriller film directed by Ran Huang, who co-wrote the screenplay along with Megan Everett-Skarsgård. The film stars Stellan Skarsgård, Andrea Riseborough, and Gustaf Skarsgård. It premiered at the Warsaw Film Festival in 2022, before a limited theatrical release throughout the UK, USA, and Finland in 2024.

== Synopsis ==
At a Scandinavian psychiatric hospital, an uneasy triumvirate consisting of multiple murderer Mads, therapist Anna, and policeman Soren all have a vested interest in unearthing the truth; and a deepening co-dependency threatens to consume them all.

== Cast ==
- Gustaf Skarsgård as Mads Lake / Sigge Storm
- Stellan Skarsgård as Soren Rank
- Andrea Riseborough as Anna Rudebeck
- Magnus Krepper as Ralf Storm
- Charlie Petersson as Kelvin Holst
- Éva Magyar as Lillemor
- Irina Björklund as Sussan
- Sophia Heikkilä as Laila
- Antti Luusuaniemi as Dr. Jespen
- Milka Ahlroth as Elin
- Darren McStay as Martin

== Production ==
What Remains was mainly shot at Paimio Sanatorium near Turku, Finland, and along the coast of Espoo, Finland.

== Reception ==
On the review aggregator website Rotten Tomatoes, 89% of 9 critics' reviews are positive, with an average rating of 6.30/10.

Jennie Kermode of Eye for Film rated the film 4.5/5 stars, and raved about its tone: "Its slow, observational style allows us to get much closer to the key figures and explore aspects of motive which are commonly lost." Rich Cline of Shadows on the Wall graded it 3/5 stars, and commented: "Fans of procedural thrillers may find this story deeply frustrating, because the more people speak to each other the further they seem to get from solving these cold cases. But it's a fiercely clever depiction of the real world complexities as opposed to standard clear-cut movie narratives."

Leslie Felperin of The Guardian scored it 3/5 stars and praised the performances, albeit not the entire film: "Stellan Skarsgård and Andrea Riseborough are already well-known quantities and dab hands at playing these kind of troubled souls, but Gustaf Skarsgård is especially extraordinary here: simultaneously fragile as a dragonfly and repellent, whispering calmly one minute and screaming with shame, confusion and pain the next. It's a fantastically well-modulated performance, but the film's obliqueness underserves it."

Craig D. Lindsey of RogerEbert.com gave it 2.5/4 stars, lauding its ambiguity: "It's a serial-killer tale that almost relishes in not reaching a satisfying conclusion." Joel Winstead of Elements of Madness, scoring it 2.5/5 stars, opined: "As I wrestle with the film's themes and questions, I'm left mostly empty and wondering what the point was." However, Francesca Steele of The i Paper awarded it 2/5 stars and took umbrage with the intent: "This is a film that dares you to pity a child molester."
