= Avie Luthra =

Indian film director and screenwriter

Avie Luthra is an Indian film director and screenwriter.

== Career ==
He began his filmmaking with a short film entitled Baby which won the Royal Television Society Award for Best Student Film in 2002. His second film entitled Cross My Heart was awarded special commendation by London Film Festival TCM Shorts in 2002.

His screenwriting credits include episodes of The Canterbury Tales in 2003 and the screenplay for the film Indian Dream. He wrote One Night in Bhopal, a documentary for the British Broadcasting Corporation, in 2004. His short film, Lucky, about a South African AIDS orphan, premiered at the Edinburgh Film Festival and got a special mention at the AFI Festival in Los Angeles. Lucky was nominated for the BAFTA Award for Best Short Film in 2006.

He is currently working on an adaptation of Preethi Nair's book, A Hundred Shades of White, for the BBC.

As of October 2007, he was in pre-production for his first feature film, "Mad, Sad & Bad". Meera Syal and Nitin Ganatra are cast in the lead parts and the film is being produced by Bex Hopkins, who produced 'Cross My Heart' and 'Lucky', and Christine Alderson for Ipso Facto Films and Roister Doister Films.

He is also a psychiatrist.

== See also ==
- Short film
- Cinema of India
