= Resistance (2011 film) =

- Directed by: Amit Gupta
- Written by: Amit Gupta; Owen Sheers
- Based on: Resistance by Owen Sheers
- Produced by: Amanda Faber; Richard Holmes
- Starring: Andrea Riseborough; Tom Wlaschiha; Michael Sheen
- Cinematography: John Pardue
- Edited by: Christopher Barwell
- Music by: Mark Bradshaw
- Production companies: Big Rich Films; Film Agency for Wales; Square One Entertainment
- Distributed by: Metrodome Distribution
- Release dates: 16 September 2011 (Cambridge Film Festival); 25 November 2011 (United Kingdom)
- Running time: 92 minutes
- Countries: United Kingdom; Germany
- Language: English

Resistance is a 2011 British film directed by Amit Gupta and starring Andrea Riseborough, Tom Wlaschiha and Michael Sheen. It is based on the 2007 novel of the same name by Owen Sheers. The film takes place in an alternative reality in which Germany invades the United Kingdom during World War II.

== Plot ==
In an alternative reality set in 1944 in which D-Day has failed and the United Kingdom has been successfully invaded by Germany, German occupiers arrive in a remote valley on the Welsh border. The local women awaken to find their husbands have left to serve in the covert British Resistance. Facing a harsh winter, the women and soldiers find they must cooperate to survive, but each distrusts the other. The women want to remain loyal to their absent husbands, while the soldiers are at war and the women are their enemy. Over time, the soldiers stop wearing their uniforms. The Germans help with farm chores or may leave a couple of shot rabbits on a porch. The Germans think the war may be over soon and want to take advantage of spending the winter away from war.

Captain Albrecht becomes close to Sarah. To prove he can be trusted, he takes her to a cave where a priceless Medieval world map has been hidden from the Germans. He studied medieval history and did not want the SS or Himmler to get it. Another much more elderly wife named Maggie has become friends with Bernhardt.

Spring has arrived and Sarah convinces Albrecht to let Maggie take her prized cob horse to the county fair, and Bernhardt accompanies her. The women wanted to know if there was any news of their husbands. A friend of Maggie tells her that the group of men that blew up the railway bridge had all been hanged by the Nazis. Maggie returns to the valley with a third-place win but is very changed by the knowledge that the husbands are dead. Young teen George sees Maggie's fair trip as a collaboration with the enemy and shoots her horse as punishment. The loss of both her husband and her horse is enough to kill Maggie.

Soldier Steiner distrusts the valley women and he runs off to town with the Army radio. Albrecht is in love with Sarah and asks her to escape with him before the Gestapo come. She agrees but actually goes home and writes her date of death in the family Bible. She then makes sure to burn the priceless map to keep it from the Germans. Always loyal to her husband and country, she walks off into the mountains to escape, and the film ends.

== Cast ==
- Andrea Riseborough as Sarah Lewis
- Tom Wlaschiha as Captain Albrecht Wolfram
- Michael Sheen as Tommy Atkins
- Kimberley Nixon as Bethan Evans
- Alexander Dreymon as Steiner
- Iwan Rheon as George Bowen
- Simon Armstrong as George's father
- Stanislav Ianevski as Bernhardt
- Sharon Morgan as Maggie Jones
- Melanie Walters as Helen Roberts
- Anatole Taubman as Sebald
- Matt Hookings as German soldier
- Mossie Smith as Ruth Evans
- George Taylor as Gernot
- Jassa Ahluwalia as Russian Partisan (voice)
- Nia Gwynne as Sian Griffiths
- Tomos Eames as Tom Lewis
- Kerry Hutchinson as Gestapo officer
- Callan Mcauliffe as Terrence Green
- Marie Ingle as Terrence Green's girlfriend
