= Resistance (Sheers novel) =

2007 novel

- First edition cover
- Author: Owen Sheers
- Cover artist: Johnny Ring
- Language: English
- Genre: Romantic, alternate history
- Publisher: Faber and Faber Limited
- Publication date: 2007
- Publication place: United Kingdom
- Media type: Print (hardback & paperback)
- Pages: 357
- ISBN: 978-0-571-22964-2 (first edition, hardback)

Resistance is a 2007 alternative history novel by Welsh poet and author Owen Sheers. The plot centers on the inhabitants of a valley near Abergavenny in Wales in 1944–45, shortly after the failure of Operation Overlord and a successful German counterinvasion of Great Britain. A group of German Wehrmacht soldiers stay there after men leave to serve in the covert British Resistance. The novel follows abandoned farmer's wife Sarah Lewis and German commanding officer Albrecht Wolfram, as they form an unlikely relationship in spite of their backgrounds and political standings.

The novel was adapted for film in 2011.

The Hereford Mappa Mundi features prominently in the book.

== Plot ==
Upon her husband's disappearance, Sarah is forced to take care of the farm. Meanwhile, she develops a relationship with German commanding officer Albrecht Wolfram as he and the other invaders seek to locate an item for Himmler's collection.

== Characters ==
- Sarah Lewis, the protagonist, is a 26-year-old farmer's wife, who learns that she must fulfill his responsibilities of taking care of the farm in her husband's absence. Sarah, initially upset at the disappearance of her husband and the other men, begins to accept to herself and others that they may not return over the course of the novel.
