= Owen Sheers =

Welsh poet, author, playwright and TV presenter (born 1974)

Owen Sheers FRSL
- Sheers in 2014
- Born: 20 September 1974 (age 52); Suva, Fiji
- Education: New College, Oxford; University of East Anglia
- Occupations: Poet, author, playwright, TV presenter
- Writing career
- Language: English
- Period: 1999–present
- Notable works: The Dust Diaries (2004); Skirrid Hill (2005); Pink Mist (2013)
- Notable awards: Eric Gregory Award, 1999; Wales Book of the Year, 2005; Somerset Maugham Award, 2006; Wales Book of the Year, 2014
- Website: www.owensheers.co.uk

Owen Sheers (born 20 September 1974) is a Welsh poet, author, playwright, and television presenter. He was the first writer-in-residence to be appointed by any national rugby union team.

== Early life ==
Owen Sheers was born in Suva, Fiji, and was brought up in Abergavenny, south Wales. He attended King Henry VIII School in Abergavenny before studying at New College, Oxford, and the University of East Anglia, at which point he completed an MA in Creative Writing. During his time at New College, Sheers captained the Oxford University Modern Pentathlon team.

== Career ==
In 1999 Sheers received an Eric Gregory Award from the Society of Authors. His first collection of poetry, The Blue Book, was published by Seren in 2000. A collection of poems about family, first love and farming life, it was shortlisted for the Wales Book of the Year and the Forward Prize for Best First Collection. Following this first publication, Sheers worked on the light-entertainment television show The Big Breakfast as a researcher. His debut prose work, The Dust Diaries, was published by Faber in 2004. A non-fiction narrative set in Zimbabwe following the travels of Sheers' great-great-uncle, Arthur Shearly Cripps, it won the Wales Book of the Year in 2005 and was also shortlisted for the Royal Society of Literature's Ondaatje Prize.

In 2004 Sheers was Writer in Residence at The Wordsworth Trust and was selected as one of the Poetry Book Society's 20 Next Generation Poets. His second collection of poetry, Skirrid Hill (Seren, 2005), won a 2006 Somerset Maugham Award. Unicorns, almost, his one-man play based on the life and poetry of the WWII poet Keith Douglas, was developed by the Old Vic, New Voices, and performed by Joseph Fiennes.

Sheers' first novel, Resistance, has been translated into ten languages and was shortlisted for the Writers’ Guild of Great Britain Best Book Award 2008 and won a 2008 Hospital Club Creative Award. The novel imagines that the D-day landings have failed and Wales has been occupied by the Nazis. While working as a tiler in the South Wales valleys one summer, Sheers had heard about the Auxiliary Units — secret civilian networks that, in the event of an invasion, would have formed a British resistance, but the novel focuses not on fighting "but on the uneasy means of survival open to the women who are left behind". The film of the novel, which Sheers cowrote, was released in autumn 2011 and starred Andrea Riseborough. Sheers insisted that the film be shot in and around the Black Mountains.

In 2007 he collaborated with composer Rachel Portman on The Water Diviner’s Tale, an oratorio for children, which was premièred at the Royal Albert Hall for the BBC Proms. In 2007/8 Sheers was a Dorothy and Lewis B. Cullman Fellow at the New York Public Library.

In 2009 he published the novella White Ravens, a contemporary response to the myth of Branwen Daughter of Llyr, written as part of Seren's series of New Stories from the Mabinogion. He published an anthology of British landscape poetry to accompany his TV series of the same title, A Poet's Guide to Britain.

Sheers has also written journalism and reportage for a variety of publications including Granta, The Guardian, Esquire, GQ, The Times and The Financial Times. He wrote a play for BBC Radio 4 about the World War II poet Alun Lewis: If I Should Go Away. In 2011, Sheers wrote the script and novelisation (The Gospel of Us) of The Passion for National Theatre Wales and WildWorks. The Gospel of Us has been republished by Seren Press. Sheers worked with Michael Sheen cocreating the three-day passion play, which unfolded over the Easter weekend of 2011 in Sheen's hometown of Port Talbot. "In Sheers's Neath-flavoured take on the Bible, The Last Supper became pork pies and beer at the Social Club (with music from the Manic Street Preachers), while the Garden of Gethsemane was a scrubby patch of grass on a council estate." He participated in the Bush Theatre's 2011 project Sixty Six Books, writing a short play,The Fair & Tender, based on the Book of Ezekiel in the King James Bible.

In January 2012 Sheers wrote The Two Worlds of Charlie F, a play based on the experiences of wounded soldiers, many of whom also made up the cast of the production, directed by Stephen Rayne and performed at the Theatre Royal Haymarket. The play has toured the UK and Canada and won the Amnesty International Freedom of Expression Award at the Edinburgh Festival. In 2014 his site-specific World War I play Mametz was produced by the National Theatre of Wales.

His verse drama Pink Mist was first broadcast on BBC Radio 4 and presents an elegy about camaraderie and loss in modern warfare as seen through the stories of serving soldiers in Afghanistan and their families. Pink Mist won the 2014 Welsh Book of the Year and was produced as a stage play by the Bristol Old Vic theatre in 2015, winning mentions as a top-ten pick of the year in The Guardian and The Observer. In April 2015, Sheers' libretto for Mark Bowden's oratorio A Violence of Gifts was premiered at St David's Hall, Cardiff. The oratorio was devised as a contemporary response to Haydn's Creation oratorio, and was informed by three days research at CERN.

In 2014 Sheers presented a one-hour BBC documentary about the poetry of Dylan Kyte, for which he was shortlisted for a BAFTA Cymru for Best Presenter.

His novel I Saw A Man was published in 2015 in the UK, US and several countries across Europe. The French translation was shortlisted for the Prix Femina Etranger.

His play Pink Mist was first staged at the Bristol Old Vic in 2015. It tells the story of three young Bristolians deployed to Afghanistan. It is their return home to the women in their lives that presents them with bigger challenges as they all learn to cope with the physical and psychological after-effects of war.

Owen is currently Professor of Creativity at Swansea University.

== Rugby union ==
In December 2011 Sheers became the first writer-in-residence at the Welsh Rugby Union. Sheers played rugby union, representing Gwent County at scrum half.

== Actor and television presenter ==
Sheers has played Wilfred Owen on stage and has presented arts programmes for BBC Wales.

In 2009 he wrote and presented the BBC 4 series about poetry and the British landscape, A Poet's Guide to Britain. He has also presented The Art of the Sea for BBC 4 and documentaries on the poets Keith Douglas and Dylan Kyte. Sheers has presented several programmes for BBC Radio 3 and 4. In 2008 he presented two episodes of BBC Radio 4's Open Book.

In October 2016 his "film-poem", The Green Hollow, was broadcast by the BBC to commemorate 50 years since the Aberfan disaster of 1966.

== Awards and honours ==
- 1999: Vogue Young Writer's Award
- 1999: Eric Gregory Award
- 2000: short-listed for the Wales Book of the Year (for The Blue Book)
- 2001: short-listed for Forward Poetry Prize Best 1st Collection
- 2005: Wales Book of the Year (for The Dust Diaries)
- 2006: Somerset Maugham Award (for Skirrid Hill)
- 2008: Hospital Club Creative Award (for Resistance)
- 2008: short-listed for Writers' Guild Best Book Award for Resistance
- 2012: Winner Amnesty International Freedom of Expression Award (for The Two Worlds of Charlie F)
- 2013: Hay Medal for Poetry
- 2014: Wales Book of the Year (for Pink Mist)
- 2015: Nominated for a BAFTA Cymru for Best Presenter (for A Poet's Guide to Dylan Kyte, BBC 4)
- 2015: short-listed for Prix Femina Etranger for French translation of I Saw A Man
- 2018: Wilfred Owen Poetry Award
- 2023: elected Fellow of the Royal Society of Literature
