= Andrea Riseborough =

British actress (born 1981)

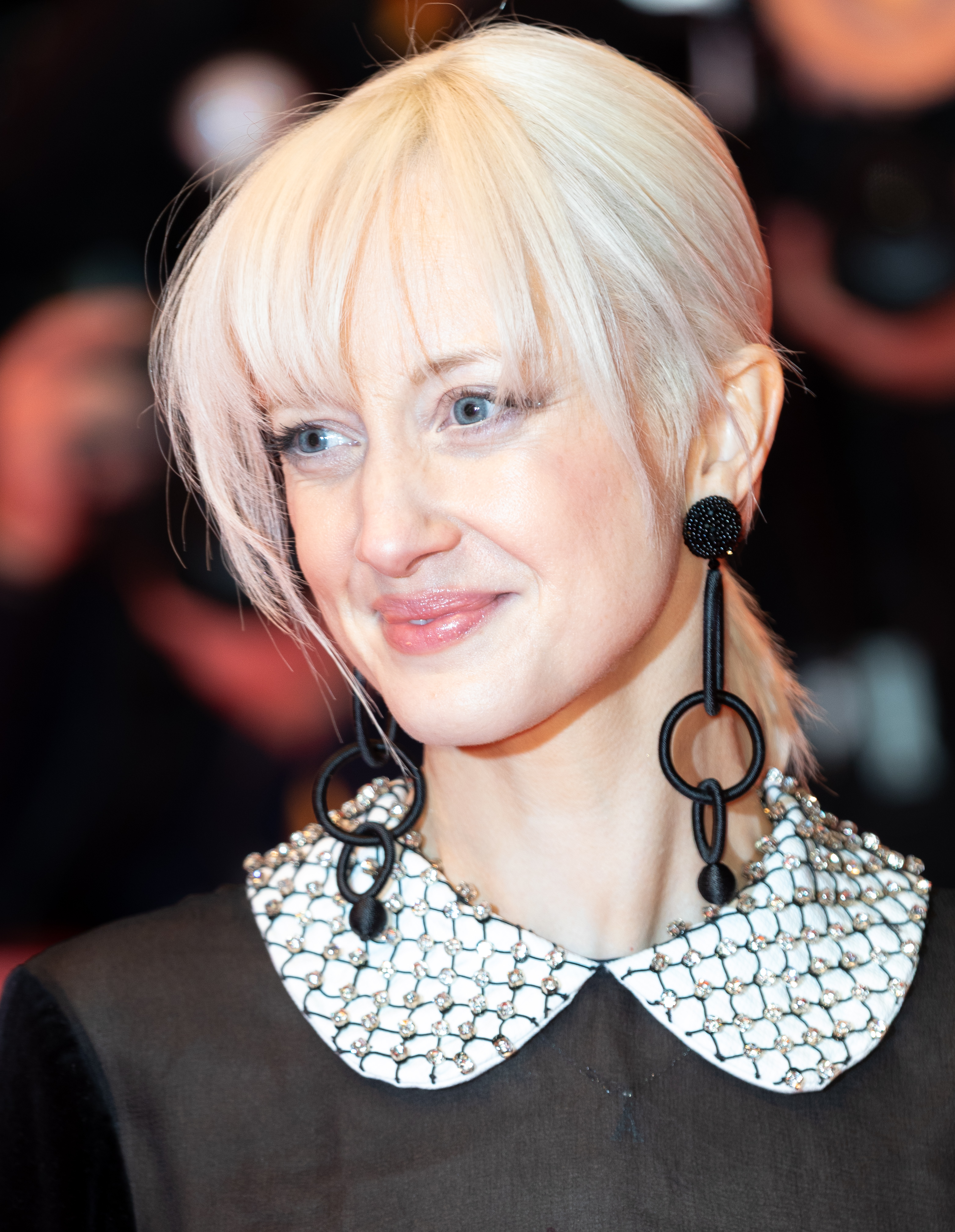
- Riseborough in 2019
- Born: Andrea Louise Riseborough; 20 November 1981 (age 44); Newcastle upon Tyne, England
- Education: Royal Academy of Dramatic Art
- Occupation: Actress
- Years active: 2001–present

Andrea Louise Riseborough (born 20 November 1981) is an English actress. She made her film debut with a small part in Venus (2006), and has since appeared in more prominent roles in Brighton Rock (2010), W.E. (2011), Shadow Dancer (2012), Oblivion (2013), Birdman (2014), Nocturnal Animals (2016), Battle of the Sexes, The Death of Stalin (both 2017), Mandy, Nancy (both 2018), The Grudge, Possessor (both 2020) and Good Boy (2025). For playing an alcoholic in To Leslie (2022), she was nominated for the Academy Award for Best Actress.

Riseborough was nominated for a BAFTA TV for her portrayal of Margaret Thatcher in the television film The Long Walk to Finchley (2008). She won critical acclaim for her performances in the Channel 4 miniseries The Devil's Whore (2008) and National Treasure (2016), as well as the BBC One miniseries The Witness for the Prosecution (2016). Her stage credits include Miss Julie, Measure for Measure (both 2006), and Anton Chekhov's Ivanov (2008).

== Early life and education ==
Riseborough was born on 20 November 1981 in Newcastle upon Tyne, the daughter of Isabel, a secretary and beautician, and George, a car dealer. She grew up in Whitley Bay. In reference to The Long Walk to Finchley, she has described her parents as "working-class Thatcherites."

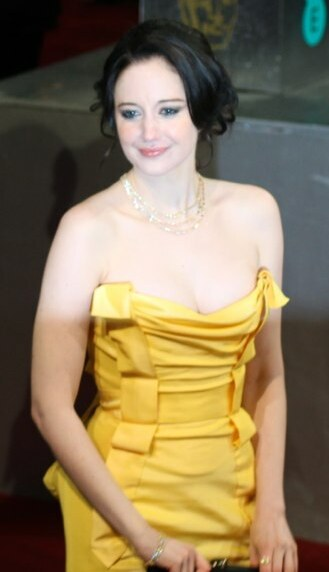
Riseborough in 2013

She appeared at the People's Theatre, Newcastle upon Tyne, in the play Riding England Sidesaddle by Christopher Goulding, as Celia Fiennes, and was a member of the Young People's Theatre for five years. Riseborough spent her schooldays at the independent school, Newcastle upon Tyne Church High School. She was a student of the Royal Academy of Dramatic Art (RADA), graduating in 2005 with a BA in Acting Degree (H Level).

== Career ==
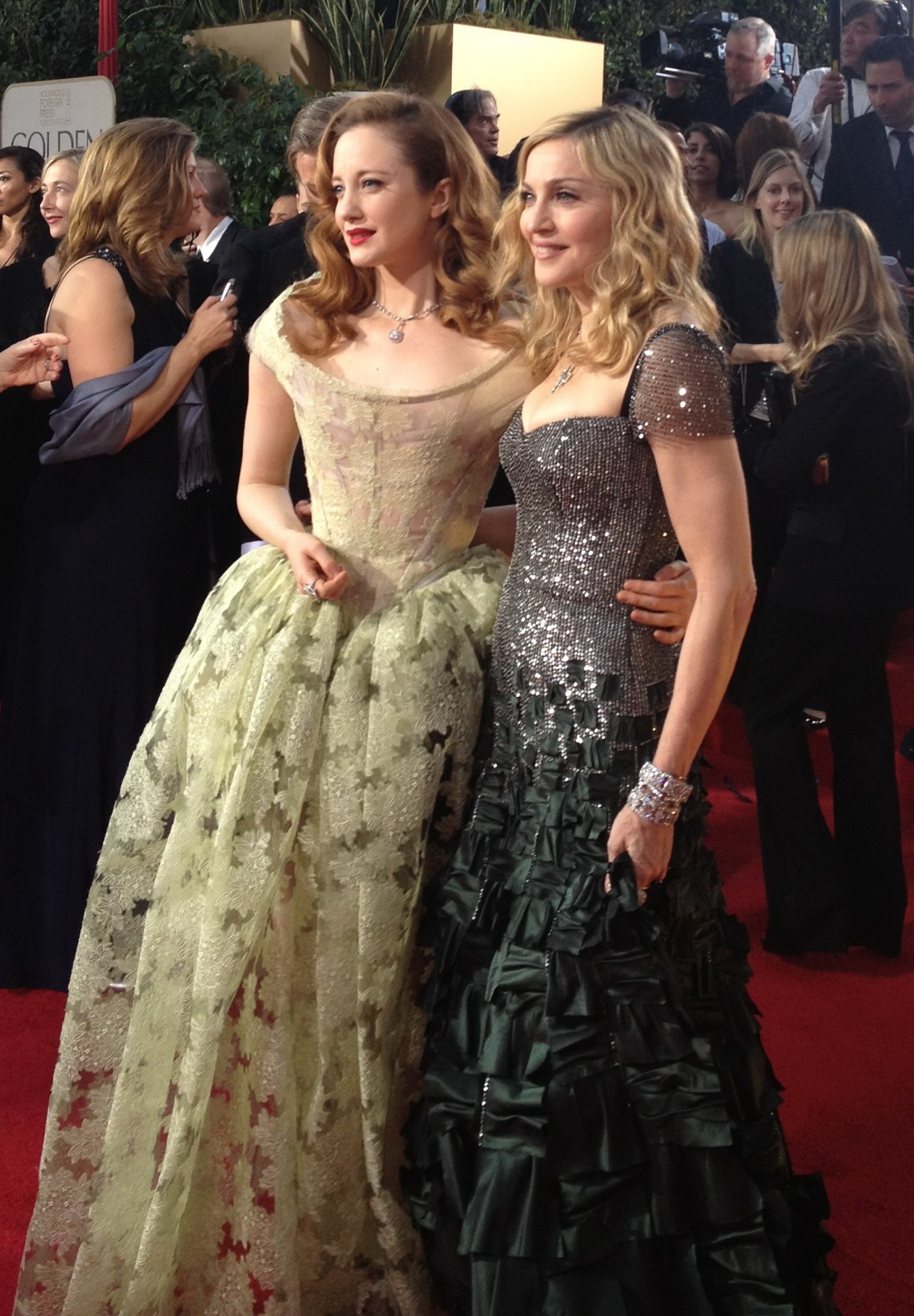
Riseborough with Madonna at the 69th Annual Golden Globes Awards

Riseborough portrayed Margaret Thatcher in the BBC Four film The Long Walk to Finchley (2008). She appeared in the 2010 films Made in Dagenham and Mark Romanek's adaptation of Never Let Me Go. She starred in the American premiere of Alexi Kaye Campbell's The Pride at the Lucille Lortel Theatre in January 2010. The production was directed by Joe Mantello. She appeared in Rowan Joffé's film adaptation of Brighton Rock. She worked with The Devil's Mistress author Peter Flannery on his screenplay based on the life of Angelica Fanshawe. She played the role of Wallis Simpson in W.E., a film directed by Madonna. She stars in Resistance, an adaptation of an Owen Sheers novel. The film was released on 25 November 2011.

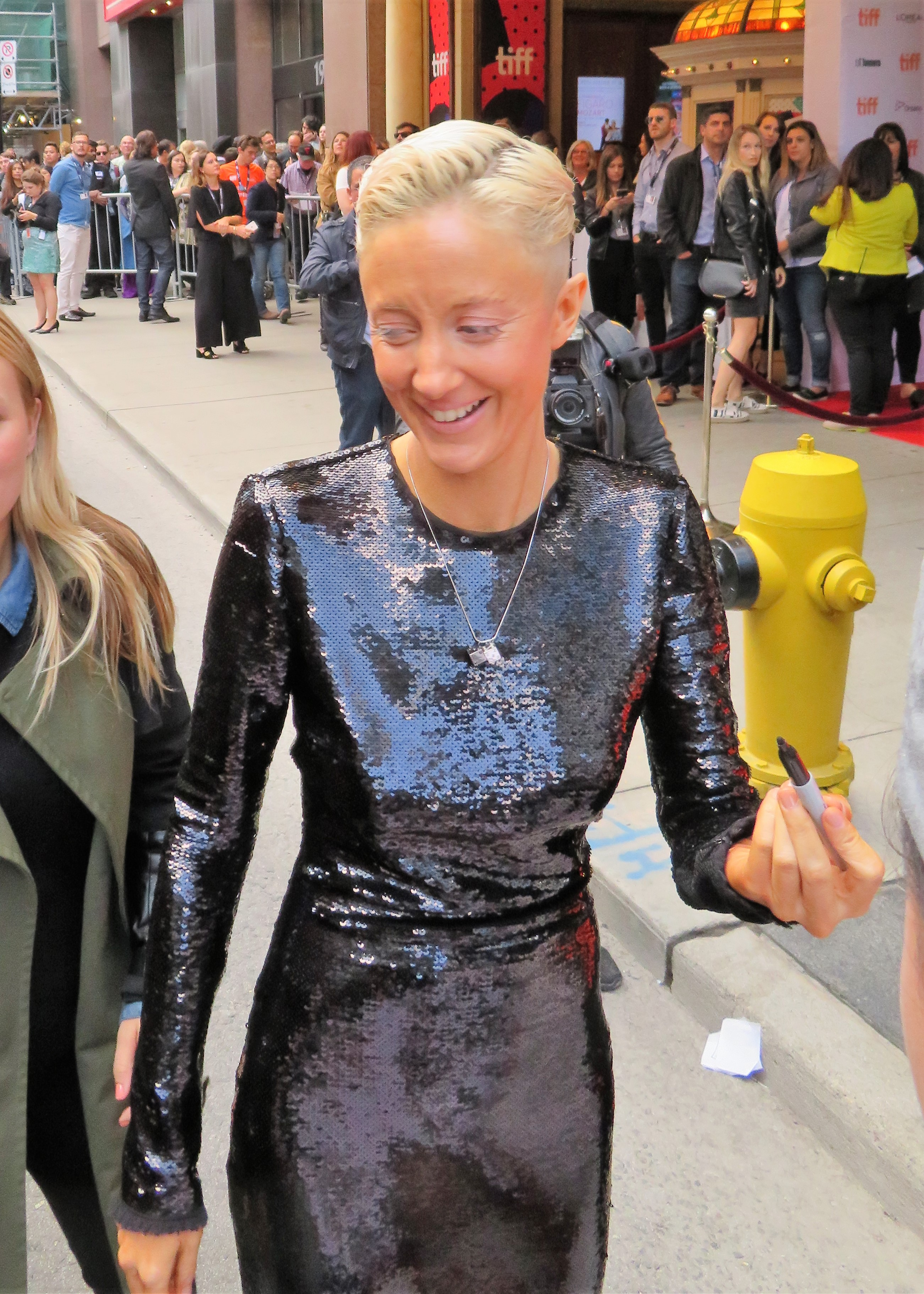
Riseborough at the premiere of The Death of Stalin, 2017 Toronto International Film Festival

She writes with her creative partner, actor Tom Burke, and with Mike Leigh. Riseborough starred in the thriller Hidden, a low-budget film directed by the Duffer Brothers. Hidden was released for streaming September 2015. She appeared in Oblivion (2013), in a supporting role. She co-starred in the acting ensemble of the Alejandro González Iñárritu's showbusiness drama film Birdman (or The Unexpected Virtue of Ignorance), which won the Oscar for Best Picture at the 87th Academy Awards. Riseborough shared the Screen Actors Guild Award for Outstanding Performance by a Cast in a Motion Picture for the film.

In 2016 she co-starred in apartheid drama Shepherds and Butchers and the Tom Ford directed psychological thriller Nocturnal Animals. She joined the cast of Netflix's Bloodline for season 2, as a series regular character, Evangeline. She acted as Emma Stone's love interest in the biographical sports film Battle of the Sexes, based on the 1973 tennis match between Billie Jean King and Bobby Riggs. She portrayed Joseph Stalin's daughter Svetlana Stalina in the 2017 comedy-drama film The Death of Stalin and was praised by Variety for the "shrewd, multi-layered complexity" of her performance.

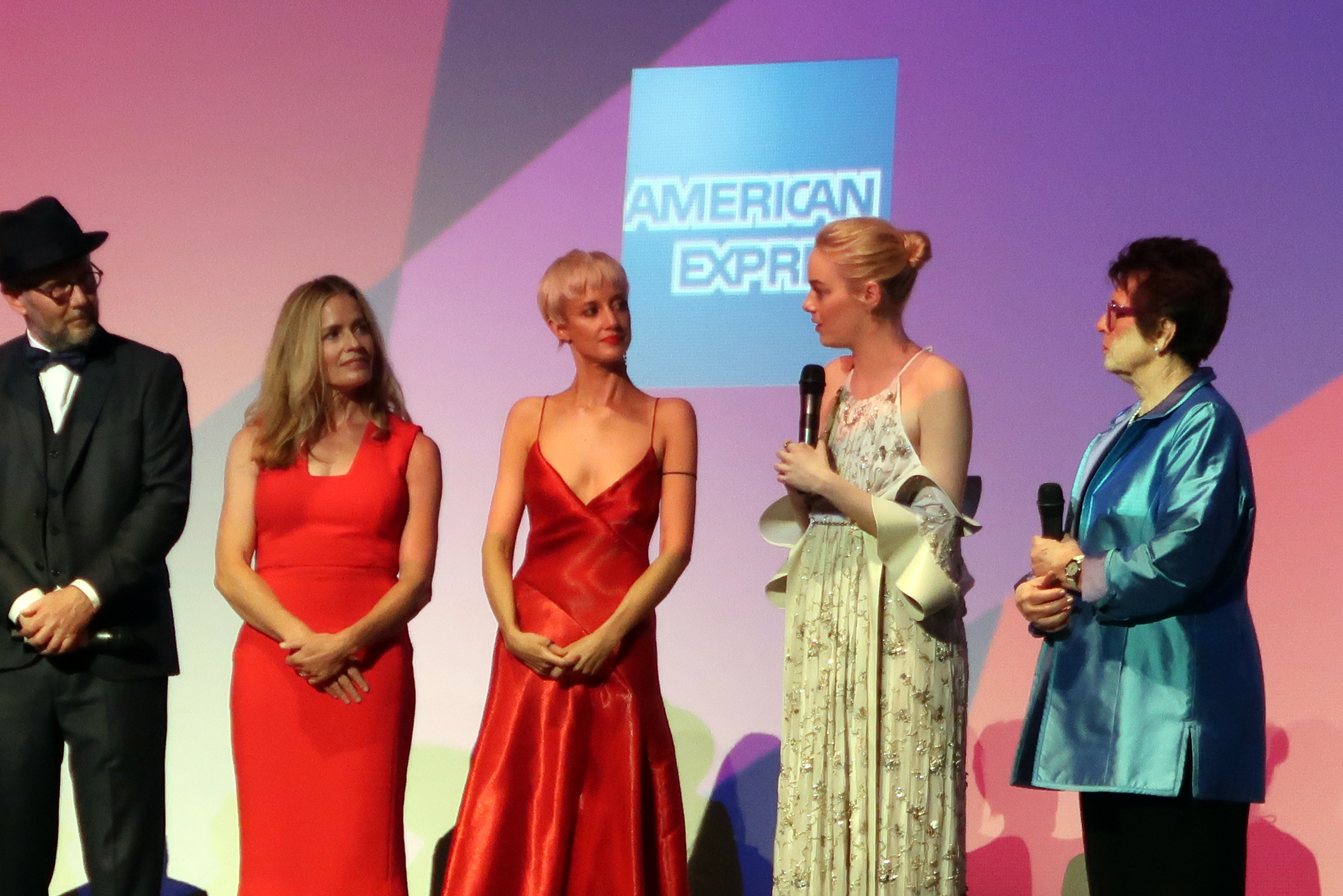
Jonathan Dayton, Elisabeth Shue, Riseborough, Emma Stone and Billie Jean King at the London premiere of Battle of the Sexes (2017)

She was cast in Waco, a six-part television series about the Waco siege. The first episode was released on 24 January 2018. That same year she acted in three films, the horror film Mandy, the mystery drama Nancy (which she also produced), and the historical drama Burden. Riseborough has been cast in Lone Scherfig's The Kindness of Strangers as an ER nurse who runs an eclectic therapy group. The film started shooting at the Russian Tea Room in the spring of 2018. She starred in a Sony remake of The Grudge. The film was released on 3 January 2020.

Riseborough starred in the international cocaine trade drama ZeroZeroZero, an eight-part series adapted from the book by Roberto Saviano, which had its debut on Sky in the UK and Amazon Prime in the US in 2020. She starred in Possessor—written and directed by Brandon Cronenberg—as Tasya Vos, an agent for a secretive organization who uses brain-implant technology to inhabit other people's bodies, driving them to commit assassinations for the benefit of high-paying clients. The film had its world premiere at the Sundance Film Festival in January 2020.

In 2022, Riseborough appeared in the film To Leslie, for which she received critical acclaim and a nomination for the Academy Award for Best Actress. Numerous celebrities praised her performance publicly and on social media, and hosted screenings during the voting period for the Academy Award nominations in January 2023. Her unexpected To Leslie nomination generated some questions and, without referring to her, the Board of Governors pledged "review of the campaign procedures around this year's nominees, to ensure that no guidelines were violated, and to inform us whether changes to the guidelines may be needed in a new era of social media and digital communication."

Also that year she had supporting roles as Mrs. Wormwood in the musical Matilda the Musical and Beatrice Vandenheuvel in David O. Russell's Amsterdam. In 2023, she acted opposite Kate Winslet portraying Vogue editor Audrey Withers in the biographical war drama Lee which premiered at the Toronto International Film Festival. In 2024, Riseborough acted opposite Winslet again, portraying the latter's character's right-hand woman, in the HBO political satire miniseries The Regime, for which she earned a nomination at the inaugural Gotham TV Awards for Outstanding Performance in a Limited Series.

== Personal life ==
Riseborough was in a relationship with Joe Appel, an American street artist, from 2009 to 2016.

== Acting credits ==
=== Film ===
Key
| † | Denotes productions that have not yet been released |

| Year | Title | Role | Notes |
|---|---|---|---|
| 2006 | Venus | Period Film Lover | |
| 2007 | Magicians | Dani | |
| 2008 | Happy-Go-Lucky | Dawn | |
| 2008 | Love You More | Georgia | Short film |
| 2009 | Mad, Sad & Bad | Julia | |
| 2010 | Made in Dagenham | Brenda | |
| 2010 | Never Let Me Go | Chrissie | |
| 2010 | Brighton Rock | Rose | |
| 2011 | Resistance | Sarah | |
| 2011 | W.E. | Wallis Simpson | |
| 2012 | Shadow Dancer | Colette McVeigh | |
| 2012 | Disconnect | Nina Dunham | |
| 2013 | Welcome to the Punch | Sarah Hawks | |
| 2013 | Oblivion | Victoria Olsen | |
| 2014 | Birdman or (The Unexpected Virtue of Ignorance) | Laura Aulburn | |
| 2014 | The Silent Storm | Aislin | |
| 2015 | Hidden | Claire | |
| 2016 | Shepherds and Butchers | Kathleen Marais | |
| 2016 | Nocturnal Animals | Alessia Holt | |
| 2016 | Mindhorn | DS Baines | |
| 2017 | Battle of the Sexes | Marilyn Barnett | |
| 2017 | The Death of Stalin | Svetlana Stalina | |
| 2018 | Mandy | Mandy Bloom | |
| 2018 | Nancy | Nancy Freeman | Also producer |
| 2018 | Burden | Judy | |
| 2019 | The Kindness of Strangers | Alice | |
| 2020 | The Grudge | Detective Muldoon | |
| 2020 | Possessor | Tasya Vos | |
| 2020 | Luxor | Hana | |
| 2021 | Here Before | Laura | |
| 2021 | The Electrical Life of Louis Wain | Caroline Wain | |
| 2022 | Please Baby Please | Suze | |
| 2022 | To Leslie | Leslie Rowlands | |
| 2022 | Amsterdam | Beatrice Vandenheuvel | |
| 2022 | Matilda the Musical | Mrs. Wormwood | |
| 2022 | What Remains | Anna Rudebeck | |
| 2023 | Lee | Audrey Withers | |
| 2024 | Au fil des saisons | Laura Sanders | |
| 2025 | Dragonfly | Colleen | |
| 2025 | Good Boy | Kathryn | |
| 2025 | Goodbye June | Molly "Mol" Cheshire | |
| 2026 | Ebenezer | Ghost of Christmas Past | |
| TBA | The Queen of Fashion † | Isabella Blow | Post-production, also producer |

=== Television ===
| Year | Title | Role | Notes |
|---|---|---|---|
| 2005 | A Very Social Secretary | Amanda | Television film |
| 2005 | Whatever Love Means | Anna Wallace | Television film |
| 2005 | Doc Martin | Samantha | Episode: "The Family Way" |
| 2006 | The Secret Life of Mrs Beeton | Myra | Television film |
| 2007 | Party Animals | Kirsty | Main role (8 episodes) |
| 2008 | Being Human | Annie | Episode: "Pilot" |
| 2008 | The Long Walk to Finchley | Margaret Thatcher | Television film |
| 2008 | The Devil's Whore | Angelica Fanshawe | Miniseries (4 episodes) |
| 2016 | Bloodline | Evangeline Radosevich | Recurring role (8 episodes) |
| 2016 | National Treasure | Dee Finchley | Miniseries (4 episodes) |
| 2016 | The Witness for the Prosecution | Romaine Heilger | Miniseries (2 episodes) |
| 2017 | Black Mirror | Mia Nolan | Episode: "Crocodile" |
| 2018 | Waco | Judy Schneider | Miniseries (6 episodes) |
| 2020 | ZeroZeroZero | Emma Lynwood | Miniseries (8 episodes) |
| 2024 | Alice & Jack | Alice | Miniseries (6 episodes); also executive producer |
| 2024 | The Regime | Agnes | Miniseries (6 episodes) |
| 2027 | The Best of Us † | Molly | Miniseries (6 episodes) |
| TBA | First Woman † | Claire Reith | Main role (6 episodes) |

=== Theatre ===
| Year | Title | Role | Venue |
|---|---|---|---|
| 2001 | A Cat in the Road | Daughter | The Customs House, South Shields |
| 2005 | A Brief History of Helen of Troy | Charlotte | Soho Theatre |
| 2005 | Burn | Linda | Royal National Theatre |
| 2006 | Chatroom | Emily | Royal National Theatre |
| 2006 | Citizenship | Chantel | Royal National Theatre |
| 2006 | Measure for Measure | Isabella | Theatre Royal, Bath |
| 2006 | Miss Julie | Miss Julie | Theatre Royal, Bath |
| 2007 | The Pain and the Itch | Kalina | Royal Court Theatre |
| 2008 | A Couple of Poor, Polish-Speaking Romanians | Dzina | Soho Theatre |
| 2008 | Ivanov | Sasha | Wyndhams Theatre |
| 2010 | The Pride | Sylvia | MCC Theater |
| 2025 | Mary Page Marlowe | Mary Paige | The Old Vic, London |

== Awards and nominations ==
| Year | Award | Category | Nominated work | Result |
|---|---|---|---|---|
| 2005 | WhatsOnStage Awards | London Newcomer of the Year | A Brief History of Helen of Troy | Nominated |
| 2006 | Ian Charleson Award | | Measure for Measure / Miss Julie | Won |
| 2007 | WhatsOnStage Awards | Best Supporting Actress in a Play | The Pain and the Itch | Nominated |
| 2009 | British Academy Television Awards | Best Actress | The Long Walk to Finchley | Nominated |
| 2009 | Royal Television Society Awards | Best Actor (Female) | The Devil's Mistress | Won |
| 2010 | British Independent Film Awards | Most Promising Newcomer | Brighton Rock | Nominated |
| 2010 | British Independent Film Awards | Best Performance by an Actress in a British Independent Film | Brighton Rock | Nominated |
| 2010 | Drama Desk Award | Outstanding Featured Actress in a Play | The Pride | Nominated |
| 2010 | Lucille Lortel Award | Outstanding Featured Actress in a Play | The Pride | Nominated |
| 2010 | Theatre World Award | | The Pride | Won |
| 2012 | British Independent Film Awards | Best Performance by an Actress in a British Independent Film | Shadow Dancer | Won |
| 2012 | Evening Standard British Film Award | Best Actress | Shadow Dancer | Won |
| 2012 | Irish Film and Television Award | Best International Actress | Shadow Dancer | Nominated |
| 2012 | London Film Critics' Circle Award | Best British Actress of the Year | Shadow Dancer | Nominated |
| 2012 | Edinburgh International Film Festival Award | Best Performance in British Feature Film | Shadow Dancer | Nominated |
| 2014 | Alliance of Women Film Journalists Award | Best Ensemble | Birdman | Won |
| 2014 | Boston Society of Film Critics Award | Best Cast | Birdman | Runner-up |
| 2014 | Boston Online Film Critics Association Awards | Best Ensemble | Birdman | Won |
| 2014 | Critics' Choice Movie Award | Best Acting Ensemble | Birdman | Won |
| 2014 | Central Ohio Film Critics Association Award | Best Ensemble | Birdman | Nominated |
| 2014 | Detroit Film Critics Society Awards | Best Ensemble | Birdman | Won |
| 2014 | Florida Film Critics Circle Awards | Best Cast | Birdman | Nominated |
| 2014 | Georgia Film Critics Association Awards | Best Ensemble | Birdman | Nominated |
| 2014 | Las Vegas Film Critics Society Awards | Best Ensemble | Birdman | Won |
| 2014 | New York Film Critics Online Awards | Best Ensemble Cast | Birdman | Won |
| 2014 | North Texas Film Critics Association Awards | Best Ensemble Cast | Birdman | Won |
| 2014 | Phoenix Film Critics Society Awards | Best Ensemble Acting | Birdman | Won |
| 2014 | San Diego Film Critics Society Awards | Best Film Ensemble | Birdman | Won |
| 2014 | Screen Actors Guild Awards | Outstanding Performance by a Cast in a Motion Picture | Birdman | Won |
| 2014 | Southeastern Film Critics Association Awards | Best Ensemble | Birdman | Nominated |
| 2014 | Washington D.C. Area Film Critics Association Awards | Best Acting Ensemble | Birdman | Won |
| 2017 | Savannah Film Festival | Outstanding Supporting Actress Award | Battle of the Sexes | Won |
| 2017 | British Independent Film Awards | Best Supporting Actress | The Death of Stalin | Nominated |
| 2018 | Sitges Film Festival | Best Actress | Nancy | Won |
| 2020 | British Independent Film Awards | Best Actress | Luxor | Nominated |
| 2022 | Chicago Film Critics Association Awards | Best Actress | To Leslie | Nominated |
| 2022 | Gijón International Film Festival Awards | Best Actress | To Leslie | Won |
| 2022 | Raindance Film Festival Awards | Best Lead Performance | To Leslie | Won |
| 2023 | Academy Awards | Best Actress | To Leslie | Nominated |
| 2023 | Chlotrudis Awards | Best Actress | To Leslie | Nominated |
| 2023 | Independent Spirit Awards | Best Lead Performance | To Leslie | Nominated |
| 2024 | Gotham TV Awards | Outstanding Performance in a Limited Series | The Regime | Nominated |

== See also ==
- List of British actors
- List of Academy Award winners and nominees from Great Britain
- List of actors with Academy Award nominations
