= Blade Runner (1997 video game) =

- Developers: Westwood Studios; Nightdive Studios (remaster)
- Publishers: Virgin Interactive; Nightdive Studios (remaster)
- Producer: Donny Blank
- Designers: David Leary; Jim Walls
- Programmer: Louis Castle
- Artists: Louis Castle; Aaron Powell
- Writers: David Yorkin; David Leary
- Composer: Frank Klepacki
- Series: Blade Runner
- Engine: KEX Engine (remaster)
- Platforms: Microsoft Windows; Nintendo Switch; PlayStation 4; Xbox One
- Release: Microsoft Windows: NA: November 13, 1997; UK: November 26, 1997; Enhanced Edition; Windows, Switch, PS4, Xbox One; June 23, 2022
- Genre: Point-and-click adventure
- Mode: Single-player

Blade Runner is a point-and-click adventure game developed by Westwood Studios and published by Virgin Interactive for Microsoft Windows, released in November 1997. The game is not a direct adaptation of the 1982 Ridley Scott film Blade Runner but is instead a "sidequel", telling an original story, which runs parallel to the film's plot, occasionally intersecting with it.

Set in 2019 Los Angeles, the game tells the story of Ray McCoy, an elite detective charged with hunting down a group of dangerous replicants (bioengineered androids designed to look and act like humans). Although several of the film's characters appear in the game, with some of the original actors returning to voice them, the film's protagonist, Rick Deckard, does not appear in a speaking role. Instead, he is referred to on multiple occasions, is seen several times, and his activities as depicted in the film are mentioned. Other parallels with the film include the reproduction of several prominent locations, as well as scenes and dialogue closely modelled on the original. The game also features extracts from the film's soundtrack.

Blade Runner was advertised as a "real-time 3D adventure game", since it was one of the first adventure games to use both 3D character rendering and a game world which progressed in real-time (as opposed to waiting for the player's actions). Unlike many games of its time, which used polygon-based renderers exploiting 3D accelerators, Westwood opted for their own software-based renderer using voxel technology.

The game received generally positive reviews and was a commercial success, selling over one million units worldwide. It went on to win the Interactive Achievement Award for "PC Adventure Game of the Year" and was nominated for "Best Adventure Game" by PC Gamer. Virgin Interactive wanted Westwood to make a sequel, but it was thought the cost of production would make the game commercially unviable and the idea was scrapped. For many years, it remained trapped in legal and intellectual property entanglement, preventing a re-release on digital storefronts, until it finally arrived on GOG.com in December 2019. Nightdive Studios and Alcon Entertainment released an Enhanced Edition of the game on Microsoft Windows, Nintendo Switch, PlayStation 4, and Xbox One on June 23, 2022.

== Gameplay ==
Blade Runner is a point-and-click adventure game played from a third-person perspective, in which the game world is navigated, explored, and manipulated using the mouse. The pointer has four different styles depending on the given situation; a standard grey pointer is used to move McCoy by clicking on any location, and scan the screen for elements with which to interact; an animated green pointer indicates McCoy can interact with an object or begin a conversation with an NPC; an animated blue pointer indicates the screen can be changed and a new area accessed (usually appears at the sides of the screen or in doorways); an animated red target becomes available only in combat mode and indicates McCoy can fire (if the target is grey, it means McCoy cannot fire).

Blade Runner's main focus is detective work rather than puzzles or combat, and the majority of gameplay consists of searching for evidence, questioning suspects and analyzing clues. Occasionally, the player must solve compulsory puzzles, and often, to progress the story, certain clues must be located. Clues are found by searching crime scenes, and come in the form of items, photographs, interviews, or unusual markings. When analyzing photographs, the player must use the ESPER system, a high-density computer with a powerful three-dimensional resolution capacity which allows for the enhancement of photos and enables the player to find details within the picture. Combat is occasionally available in the game, but is rarely compulsory. The only weapon available to the player is McCoy's standard issue police pistol, which may be loaded with various types of ammunition.

Another important investigative tool at the player's disposal is the Voight-Kampff machine, which tests people to determine if they are replicants. Usually, Voight-Kampff tests are automatically triggered at certain predetermined points in the game, although on occasion, the player has the option of administering a test. The test depicts a close-up of the subject's eye, and features three needles. The further the top needle moves to the right, the more likely the subject is a human; the further the bottom needle moves to the right, the more likely they are replicant. The third needle is on a sweeping axis and measures the intensity of the questions (for every question the player can choose low, medium or high intensity), and the pressure felt by the subject. If the player pushes the subject too far, by asking too many high intensity questions, the test will end before a definite result can be obtained. If the player determines with certainty whether a subject is or is not a replicant, the test ends automatically. The player must then decide what course of action to take, with the decision influencing the rest of the storyline; for example, if a subject tests positive as a replicant, the player can kill them, attempt to arrest them, or let them go. Which characters are replicants is randomized each time a new game is started.

Aside from choosing how to react to Voight-Kampff results, the player must also decide how McCoy conducts himself in other areas of the game, such as whether to interrogate an NPC or simply talk to them and how aggressive to be in his questioning. The player can choose from one of five settings regarding McCoy's demeanor during conversations: "Polite", "Normal", "Surly", "Erratic" (the game randomly picks one of the first three options at different points of the conversation), and "User Choice". If the fifth option is selected, conversations with NPCs will present the player with menus from which they can choose their questions, rather than the game automatically selecting questions. Each choice will affect the storyline differently, with the player's cumulative decisions leading to one of the game's thirteen different endings.

All clues, conversation histories, and documents are stored in McCoy's "Knowledge Integration Assistant" (KIA), where they are automatically organized for easy access. The KIA has three main sections. The "Crime Scene Panel" lists the various crime scenes, along with all known suspects and all related clues. The "Suspect Panel" displays all available information about the suspects for the various crimes. It includes a photo of the suspect (if the player has found one), a list of crimes to which they are connected, and a list of clues which tie them to a specific crime. Suspect clues are arranged into four categories; "Whereabouts" (known places the suspect has visited, and suggestions as to their current location), "MO" (information on the suspect's previous actions, and suggestions as to their possible future actions), "Replicant" (any evidence suggesting the suspect may be a replicant) and "Non-replicant" (any evidence suggesting the suspect may be a human). The "Clue Panel" is a master list of all clues, but also contains clues which have not been linked to a specific crime or suspect as of yet, and, as such, are not available in either of the other two sections. The KIA also keeps track of McCoy's money and ammunition.

The game runs in nonlinear "real time", meaning that as McCoy investigates and gathers clues, the NPC characters are doing the same, completing their own objectives and performing random actions elsewhere in the game world. A good example of this is found in the computer mainframe, which is accessible from the police headquarters. When the player uploads their KIA data into the mainframe, any evidence collected by other Blade Runners is automatically downloaded into the player's KIA. This tends to be random, with different pieces of evidence discovered by different Blade Runners becoming available at different times of the game.

== Story ==
"Welcome to Los Angeles 2019. Life on Earth has changed dramatically. The gnarled buildings of downtown Los Angeles are drenched in the mist and shadows of uncertainty. Off-world colonization has become reality. Replicants are illegal on earth – by penalty of death. As part of a special police squad – Blade Runners – you have orders to shoot to kill, upon detection, any trespassing replicant. This is not called murder. It is called retirement. You are Ray McCoy, a rookie Blade Runner. Usually, you're assigned to false leads and public complaints. But a rash of replicant detections and your new lieutenant have given you the chance to investigate an especially vicious case of animal murder. Most people in L.A. 2019 wouldn't think of killing one of the precious few real animals left. Replicants may be involved."

=== Main characters ===
Ray McCoy is the game's main player character.

- Ray McCoy (voiced by Mark Benninghofen): the game's protagonist and a rookie Blade Runner. McCoy shares his apartment with his pet dog, Maggie.
- Crystal Steele (Lisa Edelstein): one of the best Blade Runners on the job and an expert in undercover work. She hates replicants, believing they should be exterminated. She is somewhat condescending towards McCoy early in the game but grows to respect him as the story progresses.
- Gaff (Javier Grajeda as Victor Gardell): a veteran Blade Runner who often offers McCoy advice.
- Lieutenant Edison Guzza (Jeff Garlin): temporarily placed in charge of the Blade Runner unit while the previous commander, Captain Bryant, is on sick leave.
- Clovis (Mark Rolston): the leader of a group of renegade replicants. Highly intelligent and eloquent, he is also extremely ruthless, unpredictable and, at times, capable of extreme acts of aggression.
- Lucy Devlin (Pauley Perrette): a fourteen-year-old girl who works at the pet store attacked by the replicants in the opening scene

=== Supporting characters ===
- Dektora (Signy Coleman): an exotic dancer.
- Sadik (Alexander Mervin): a member of Clovis' gang.
- Howie Lee (Toru Nagai): the owner of a restaurant in Chinatown.
- Zuben (Gerald Okamura): a replicant who works as a chef at Howie Lee's Restaurant in Chinatown.
- Luther and Lance (Jason Cottle): identical twin replicant brothers who are former Tyrell Corporation employees.
- Gordo Frizz (Bruno Oliver): a stand-up comedian.
- Runciter (Warren Burton): the owner of the pet store attacked by the game's replicants.
- Izo (Timothy Dang): a weapons dealer who supplies automatic firearms to Clovis' gang.
- Bullet Bob (Vincent Schiavelli): a World War III veteran who runs a gun shop near Animoid Row.

Original cast members from the 1982 film who make cameo appearances in the game are Sean Young as Rachael, Brion James as Leon, James Hong as Hannibal Chew, Joe Turkel as Dr. Eldon Tyrell, and William Sanderson as J.F. Sebastian.

=== Plot ===
McCoy stands at the White Dragon Noodle Bar, the same location where Rick Deckard first appears in the film.

The game begins shortly after the beginning of the film, with McCoy tasked with tracking down a group of replicants who are suspected of murdering animals—a crime nearly as heinous as murdering humans since most animal species are extinct and real specimens are exceedingly rare.

As McCoy's investigation progresses, he is framed for the murder of a civilian by the corrupt Lieutenant Guzza, who has been assisting the replicants in an effort to prevent them from revealing his activities. Forced into hiding, McCoy explores the underbelly of LA and makes contact with the replicant twins Luther and Lance, former genetic designers for the Tyrell Corporation who are now working to extend their own lifespans as well as those of all other replicants. From them, McCoy receives a detailed report containing evidence of Guzza's corruption. Using this information, he blackmails Guzza and forces him to set his falsified record straight. They meet in the city sewers for the exchange, where Guzza is wounded by replicant gunfire. At this point, the player can either run away or kill Guzza.

The game features thirteen different endings, which are influenced by the player's cumulative actions and decisions throughout the story. The endings are variations on three major themes:

- McCoy is human and hunts down the replicants either alone or with Crystal.
- McCoy is a replicant himself and sides with the other replicants.
- McCoy's status remains ambiguous and he sides with neither the replicants nor the police, instead leaving the city—either alone, with Dektora, or with Lucy.

=== Poems ===
Within the plot Clovis is shown as a big fan of William Blake. The following works were cited:

- The Tyger - In the opening cutscene, when he kills the animals (including a tiger, the most valuable animal in the collection) belonging to Runciter, who sexually harassed Clovis's 14 y.o. stepdaughter Lucy, who was an employee in his shop, in order to punish him.
- Jerusalem - the last stanza, when discussing McCoy fate at the roof.
- The Marriage of Heaven and Hell - "A fool sees not the same tree a wise man sees." - when discussing McCoy fate in the room.
- A Poison Tree - the first stanza, when visiting the twins.
- To Tirzah - The first stanza, when killing Guzza.
- Memory, Hither Come - the last stanza, when assaulting Tyrell.
- With happiness stretchd across the hills - the third part of the poem, the last words before expiration.

== Development ==
=== Origins ===
The initial idea for a video game adaptation of Blade Runner came from The Blade Runner Partnership (composed of Bud Yorkin and Jerry Perenchio of Tandem Productions). They originally approached Electronic Arts, Sierra and Activision, before Virgin Interactive agreed to take the project on. However, the rights to the film were spread out over several entities, each of whom owned a different aspect, making production of the game complex from a copyright perspective; The Ladd Company owned North American distribution rights to the film; Run Run Shaw owned international distribution rights; and The Blade Runner Partnership owned all ancillary rights, and were the bond guarantors, who had taken control of the film when it went over-budget and over-schedule towards the end of production. As a result, sorting out the rights took several years before Virgin were in a position to actually begin development. They ultimately hired Westwood Studios to work on the game, but even with the rights secured, and the game in pre-production, there were still legal problems. As Louis Castle, the game's executive producer, art director and technical director, explains

The entanglements were very deep in the sense that different people had different deals. And worse yet, the production ended on a sour note and many of the records were lost. So no one knows who might come out of the woodwork claiming ownership of the film, or even pieces of it. We were prohibited from using any footage or audio because we'd never know whose rights we might be trampling on.

However, Castle's unique idea for the game somewhat side-stepped the potential legal problems. He didn't want to adapt the film; he wanted to make an original game set within the film's milieu. This would mean the game would not have to borrow as heavily from the film as it would were it a straight adaptation, hence avoiding the potential legal problems down the road. Virgin loved Castle's idea, and asked him to make a pitch to Bud Yorkin. Castle built a demo for the pitch, but rather than using footage from the film, he and his team created a rough opening cutscene based on the film's aesthetic style, but without recreating any exact scenes. According to Castle, going into the pitch, Yorkin was concerned about how much footage from the film would be needed for the game, but when he saw the demo, he was thrilled, and asked Castle if the whole game could be made in a similar manner. From that point forward, the development team had one overriding mandate; every scene in the game would be generated from scratch in 3D; no footage from the film would be used.

Although both footage and the film's soundtrack were off-limits, the designers were allowed to re-create the likenesses of the actors who had appeared in the film. Westwood never intended for Rick Deckard to be a major character in the game, but they did attempt to contact Harrison Ford with the intention of asking him to make a cameo appearance. However, they never received a response. This didn't surprise them, as Ford had had a negative experience working on the film and, at the time, even refused to talk about it in interviews. According to Castle, Ford was also against the concept of video games based on films in general. The designers were also unable to get any input from Ridley Scott, the film's director, as he too had had a bad experience on the film, and had fallen out with Bud Yorkin and Jerry Perenchio when they took over production. He was uninterested in participating in the game.

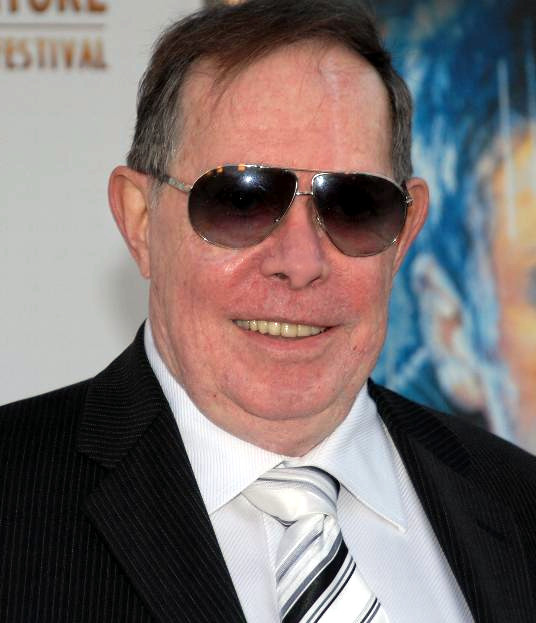
Syd Mead was credited as "visual futurist" on the film, and his concept art was the starting point for the film's aesthetic design. He contributed to the game insofar as he sent the designers samples of his original Blade Runner artwork.

One major contributor to the film who did work with the developers, however, was Syd Mead, whose concept art formed the basis for Blade Runner's aesthetic. Mead sent the team extracts from his original Blade Runner artwork. However, they quickly noticed a disparity – Mead's art didn't correlate with the finished film; whilst his artwork tended to be highly stylized and polished, the film had a much grittier and "lived-in" texture. The team contacted one of the film's set builders, who explained that had Mead's artwork been used as it was presented, the film would have cost too much, so production designer Lawrence G. Paull and art director David Snyder had decided to create "less perfect" versions of Mead's designs; they took Mead's concepts and remoulded them. Inspired by this, Castle issued a similar directive to his design team; nothing in the game was to be created from scratch, everything had to come from either the film or Mead's art.

=== Story ===
From the beginning, Westwood had no interest in doing a straight adaptation of the film as either a shoot 'em up or traditional point-and-click adventure game. As a result, the team decided to write a new story set within the fictional milieu of the film – a story in which players would play not as Rick Deckard, but as a new character, Ray McCoy. This allowed fans of the film the experience of seeing the sights and sounds of the movie, but without knowing where the story is heading.

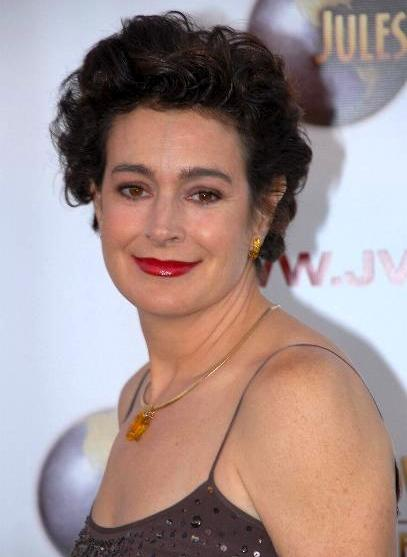
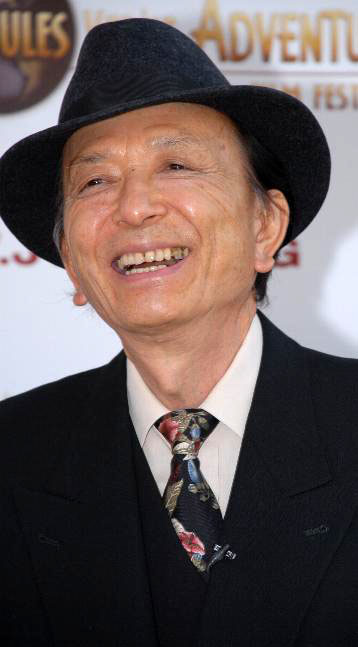
Sean Young (left) and James Hong (right) were two of the actors from the film who reprised their roles in the game, playing Rachael and Hannibal Chew, respectively.

The writers decided the plot of the game would begin shortly after the opening of the film, with Deckard having already been assigned to track down Roy Batty and the other replicants. The game's plot was imagined in such a way that the player would occasionally hear about Deckard, but would never meet him. For example, when visiting the Tyrell building, Rachael mentions that she has already spoken to another Blade Runner, and Tyrell tells McCoy, "as I explained to Mr. Deckard earlier, I've given the Nexus 6 a past." Another example is a photograph taken in Animoid Row, which shows Deckard in the background, and prompts McCoy to exclaim "He looks familiar." Additionally, while searching Leon's room in the Yukon hotel, McCoy discovers Det. Holden's badge, and Lt. Guzza questions how Deckard missed it, going on to say, "Deckard, he feels too much, ya' know?" The developers were also keen to include locations from the film, such as the Bradbury Building, the Tyrell Corporation Pyramid, and the L.A.P.D.'s cylindrical skyscraper. They also enlisted many of the actors from the film to make cameos in the game; Sean Young as Rachael, Brion James as Leon, James Hong as Hannibal Chew, Joe Turkel as Dr. Eldon Tyrell, and William Sanderson as J.F. Sebastian.

Of paramount importance to the designers was that the story of the film be treated as sacrosanct – nothing the player can do in the game can ever alter, contradict or in any way run contrary to what happens in the film. David Yorkin, Bud's son, and David Leary worked on the game's script, initially writing it as a linear game. However, the designers wanted the game to feature a great deal of random elements, with the idea being that no two playthroughs would be the same, and no walkthrough would be able to cover every possible eventuality or every possible combination of random events. The game presents the player with fifteen suspects, but only two are always replicants (Clovis and a cook named Zuben). Which of the other thirteen characters is a replicant is randomized every time the player plays the game, and their behavior is different each playthrough based upon whether or not they are human. Due to the random nature of the game, the script swelled to 500 pages, and the quality assurance people had to play through the game 2,500 times to experience every possible variation.

Because of how central to the plot randomness is, NPC behavior was not scripted. Instead, each NPC is assigned certain goals to accomplish based upon whether they are a replicant or a human. How they go about accomplishing these goals is handled by the AI system, and can change from game to game, as most of the goals have several possible methods of achievement. The developers likened this aspect of the game to simulation games such as SimCity rather than traditional adventure games such as Myst. Castle explains, "those agents are real, goal-oriented artificial intelligences. We don't know what they're going to do, exactly. We've given them behavior, we haven't given them instructions. There's a big difference between behavior-based AI and scripted instructions."

=== Design ===
"When we told Intel that we were doing a 640x480, 65,000 color game that emulates true color, with a 16-bit Z-buffer and six channel CD-quality audio, they said you can't – the PCI bus can't support it. So we felt good about ourselves, because we hadn't even mentioned the 750,000 polygons for the characters yet."

— Louis Castle; executive producer, art director and technical director

The graphic design of Blade Runner was extremely ambitious for the available technology of the time. In contrast to many contemporaneous games, the game engine included pre-rendered backgrounds and 3D characters, but did not require the use of any hardware 3D accelerators. Designers David Leary and James Walls achieved this through a self-developed technology using voxels (pixels with width, height and depth). Castle explains,

We had to invent a new technology for the characters. We went back to voxel technology and used it as a launching pad. What we are using is not voxels, but sort of 'voxels plus.' We use voxels to do the three-dimensional rotations, transformations, and projections that create the character, but we actually use a very fast polygon rendering engine to render the polygons to the screen. By not having to have a voxel model that is so dense that every pixel is a voxel, we were able to achieve much higher frame rates with much more polygons on the screen and have lots of characters.

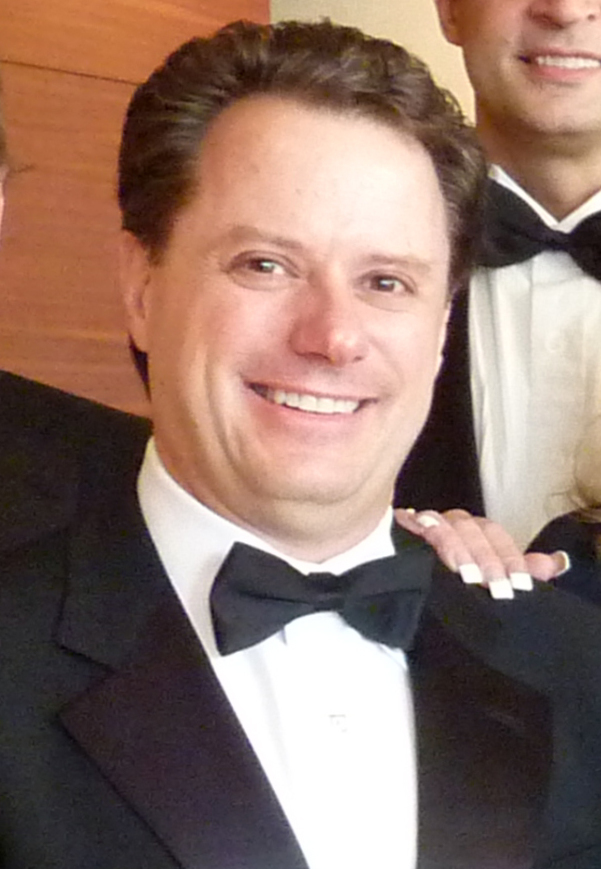
Louis Castle, co-founder of Westwood Studios, and executive producer, art director and technical director of Blade Runner.

The use of voxels, however, meant 3D accelerators couldn't be used, as there would be too many polygons for a card to render. Instead, the designers used a fast rectangular rendering routine that rendered a rectangle whenever it had to draw a polygon. Speaking in 2014, Castle said "people ask me all the time "Why didn't you just use 3D?" Well, that's easy to say now we have full rendering pipelines and shaders, but back then you just didn't. You had a few vertex-shaded polygons and the texel mapping just wasn't accurate on a lot of the cards. Nowadays I'd do it all in 3D." Another reason for not using 3D accelerators was that the game features roughly 140 locations, most of them open to player exploration. Each of these locations featured millions of polygons, well beyond the capabilities of even the most high end graphics cards of the time.

The game's environment takes up 60–65% of the CPU bandwidth, primarily because of the moving camera, but also because eight different characters can appear on screen at any one time – a large number for the technology of the time. Because of this, a powerful CPU was required to run the game, since the engine relied on the processor doing all the work in creating the 3D models. However, despite this limitation, the game runs at a minimum of 15 FPS, even on slow systems. The downside to this was that, since processor power at that time was limited, the in-game 3D models tended to look very pixelated, especially up-close and when motionless, due to the low amount of voxels used to display them. However, had the number of voxels been raised to increase the detail on the characters, the game would have become too slow to play, even on advanced CPUs.

All character animations in the game are based on motion-captured actors, with the characters moving in the pre-rendered 3D environment. At the time, any game that attempted 1,000 motion-captured sequences was considered cutting edge; Blade Runner featured 20,000. Speaking in 2014, Castle stated

where the technology let us down was in the time and energy needed to process the motion-capture. We were capturing at 60 frames per second, and the characters in voxel space took up so much that we had to go through them, removing those frames by hand using keyframing. The original voxel objects weighed in at around seven megabytes in size while hardware at the time could manage only about 100K. Automatic optimisation would leave them unbearably blocky, leaving Westwood to do it by hand. Naturally, the studio didn't have time for 20,000 sequences, which is why some of the game's objects look plain bizarre. It just took too long.

=== Music ===
The rights for the film's original soundtrack could not be secured for the game, so Westwood brought in their in-house composer Frank Klepacki to create new tracks based on Vangelis' score, and also to re-record some of the main tracks from the film. As Klepacki was not allowed access to the original master recordings, he had to re-create the music by ear.

== Reception ==
Reception

Aggregate score
Aggregator	Score
GameRankings	77%

Review scores
Publication	Score
Adventure Gamers	4.5/5
GameRevolution	A−
GameSpot	6/10
Next Generation	4/5
RPGFan	93%
Science Fiction Weekly	A+

Award
Publication	Award
Academy of Interactive Arts & Sciences	Adventure Game of the Year (1997)

Blade Runner received generally positive reviews. It held an aggregate score of 77% on GameRankings, based on sixteen reviews.

Next Generation rated it four stars out of five, and stated that "the game's shortcomings seem irrelevant as the journey that Ridley Scott and Harrison Ford began 15 years ago is brought to an entirely new end at the player's command. All movie-licensed game publishers should take note." GamePro likewise judged that the game's strongest points are its faithfulness to the book and movie and the way the ending is determined by the player's actions throughout the game. They also complimented the cinematics, dialogue, and "riveting plot and slick style", though they criticized the character models for their "overwrought body language" and said that those who are not fans of Blade Runner would find it solid but unexciting. They gave it a 4.5 out of 5 for graphics, 5.0 for sound, 4.0 for control, and 4.5 for fun factor.

Science Fiction Weekly's Peter Suciu awarded it an A+, writing the "computer-generated setting of Blade Runner is simply one of the best to arrive on computer desktops," and calling the game "an outstandingly enjoyable adventure simulation." Game Revolution's Marke Cooke scored the game an A−, calling it "one of the best adventure games out there." RPGFan gave the game an overall rating of 93%, praising its pre-rendered backgrounds, with "rain, spotlights, Spinners or blimps advertising off-world vacations. The crisp images never fail to dazzle." Although the review pointed out that the graphics can become a "tad blurry and pixilated," it was argued "this doesn't detract too much from these otherwise stunning visuals."

In a 2006 review for Adventure Gamers, Chris Pickering scored the game 4.5 out of 5, praising it for its "glorious aesthetics, intriguing storyline, and well implemented controls."

Less impressed was GameSpot's Ron Dulin, who scored the game 6 out of 10, calling it "an interesting mood piece, built upon some very detailed graphic work and an interesting premise – but somewhere along the production line, someone forgot to include a game." He was critical of the random nature of the game, especially the multiple endings; "To justify the number of wildly different endings, the designers have tried to keep some elements of the story very vague for the bulk of the story. But even with these safeguards, there are always a number of confusing contradictions and loose ends no matter how the story winds up." He concluded, "most of what's interesting about the game is exactly what was interesting about the film, and not much was done to extend the concepts or explore them any further. Fans of the film will undoubtedly overlook the game's flaws and enjoy living the life of the Blade Runner, even if it only lasts a few hours. But those who are awaiting the next generation of adventure games are advised to keep waiting."

In a 2007 article for Computer and Video Games, "Blade Runner: A Classic Revisited", Duncan Harris argued "critics may have been divided over the means by which you got there: a logical trail of clues, many of which were less the result of detective work than blind luck and idle exploration [...] but you couldn't deny that here, for once, was a movie tie-in which put the movie first, dismissing thoughts of its own genre and letting the subject dictate the design. With its insular thinking, it's something the games industry all too rarely sees."

=== Sales and awards ===
Blade Runner was a commercial success. In the United States alone, it sold 15,307 copies and earned $795,045 by November 30, 1997. Between January 1998 and July 1998, it sold another 47,939 copies in the region, which drew $2,283,055 in revenues. Westwood's Louis Castle reported that its lifetime sales had reached 800,000 units worldwide by February 2002. Blade Runner's sales ultimately surpassed one million units by 2006; Castle claimed that it outsold The Curse of Monkey Island three to one.

Blade Runner was the winner in the category of "PC Adventure Game of the Year" during the Academy of Interactive Arts & Sciences' inaugural Interactive Achievement Awards; it also received nominations for "Outstanding Achievement in Art/Graphics", "Computer Entertainment Title of the Year", "Outstanding Achievement in Software Engineering", and "Interactive Title of the Year", losing in the first category to Riven: The Sequel to Myst, the second category to StarCraft, and the last two to GoldenEye 007. In 1998, it was nominated for "Adventure Game of the Year" by Computer Gaming World and for "Best Adventure Game" at the PC Gamer awards, losing on both occasions to The Curse of Monkey Island.

In 2011, Adventure Gamers named Blade Runner the 21st-best adventure game ever released. PC Gamer also did a retrospective on the game, praising it for being authentic to the cyberpunk setting more than other similar themed games.

== Sequel and re-release ==
=== Sequel ===
Blade Runner sold well, but due to high development costs, the profit margin was low. According to Louis Castle, "The mere fact it was four CDs made it a very expensive game. And the deal we had with the Blade Runner Partnership meant it was not terribly profitable. It didn't do as well as you might think." Although Virgin were interested in doing a sequel, if a sequel were approved, the Blade Runner Partnership intended to increase the licensing fee. Ultimately, Westwood and Virgin concluded the cost of producing a game to top the original, coupled with the increased cost for licensing, made the prospect of a sequel economically untenable, as such a sequel would have to sell several million units to generate what would be considered an acceptable profit. In 2009, the Blade Runner Partnership offered Gearbox Software the rights to the franchise, but production costs were estimated at $35 million and the project was scrapped.

=== Re-release ===
Speaking in 2015 regarding a possible re-release of the game via Steam or GOG.com, Louis Castle explained the source code and assets were lost when Westwood moved its studio from Las Vegas to Los Angeles, thus making a re-release or a HD remaster impossible. Even if the code was found, to restore almost a terabyte of assets, whether for new pre-rendered backdrops or full real-time 3D, would cost tens of millions of dollars, making a re-release as unlikely as a sequel. The Blade Runner Partnership and Electronic Arts owned the rights to the game for many years by that point.

The game made it to GOG.com on December 17, 2019, after an agreement with Alcon Interactive Group and the website, using ScummVM.

=== ScummVM ===
Several attempts were made to reverse engineer the game's engine. As it is technically complex with voxel graphics for the in-game actors, video backgrounds, and randomised paths, it took the ultimately successful project with combined efforts eight years to completion. The new Blade Runner engine was included in the game engine collection ScummVM on 13 October 2016. It took another three years until it was ready for public testing on 16 June 2019, and was included in ScummVM version 2.1.0.

=== Enhanced Edition ===
Nightdive Studios and Alcon Entertainment announced they would be developing an Enhanced Edition of the game. It was originally planned to release in 2020 for Microsoft Windows, PlayStation 4, Xbox One and Nintendo Switch, but was delayed to an unspecified date due to technical issues. Stephen Kick explained that while the source code for the game was lost, they had reverse engineered it and reworked within their proprietary KEX Engine, used for other remastered games. In addition to support for modern systems, the Enhanced Edition included updated character models, animations and cutscenes. Many of the supporting assets to make the fixed graphic scenes were also lost, so Nightdive used a combination of graphics tools and machine learning to upscale these for modern systems as well as increasing the frame rate on the video scenes.

Blade Runner: Enhanced Edition was released on June 23, 2022. The game received negative reception on release, much criticism being aimed at issues relating to the graphics, which were compared negatively to those of the original game or the unofficial ScummVM port, with Metacritic listing Blade Runner: Enhanced Edition as the tenth-worst game of 2022. Nightdive informed they would fix this in upcoming patches. Nightdive updated the Steam version of the Enhanced Edition to include the ScummVM version alongside the enhanced version a few days later.
