= Tears in rain monologue =

Soliloquy from the 1982 film Blade Runner

Roy Batty (portrayed by Rutger Hauer) during the scene in the Final Cut of Blade Runner

"Tears in rain" is a 42-word monologue, consisting of the last words of main antagonist Roy Batty (portrayed by Dutch actor Rutger Hauer) in the 1982 Ridley Scott film Blade Runner, as he dies during a thunderstorm. Written by David Peoples and altered by Hauer, the monologue is frequently quoted. Critic Mark Rowlands described it as "perhaps the most moving death soliloquy in cinematic history", and it is commonly viewed as the defining moment of Hauer's acting career.

== Context ==
The monologue is near the conclusion of Blade Runner, in which detective Rick Deckard (played by Harrison Ford) has been ordered to track down and kill Roy Batty, a rogue artificial "replicant". During a rooftop chase in heavy rain, Deckard misses a jump and hangs on to the edge of a building by his fingers, about to fall to his death. Batty turns back and lectures Deckard briefly about how the tables have turned, but pulls him up to safety at the last instant. Recognizing that his limited lifespan is about to end, Batty talks to Deckard, reflecting on his own experiences and mortality.

I've seen things you people wouldn't believe. Attack ships on fire off the shoulder of Orion. I watched C-beams glitter in the dark near the Tannhäuser Gate. All those moments will be lost in time, like tears in rain. Time to die.

== Script and Hauer's input ==
In the documentary Dangerous Days: Making Blade Runner, Hauer, director Ridley Scott, and screenwriter David Peoples confirm that Hauer significantly modified the speech. In his autobiography, Hauer said he merely cut the original scripted speech by several lines, adding only, "All those moments will be lost in time, like tears in rain". One earlier version in Peoples' draft screenplays was:

I've known adventures, seen places you people will never see, I've been Offworld and back... frontiers! I've stood on the back deck of a blinker bound for the Plutition Camps with sweat in my eyes watching stars fight on the shoulder of Orion... I've felt wind in my hair, riding test boats off the black galaxies and seen an attack fleet burn like a match and disappear. I've seen it, felt it...!

And, the original script, before Hauer's rewrite, was:

I've seen things... seen things you little people wouldn't believe. Attack ships on fire off the shoulder of Orion bright as magnesium... I rode on the back decks of a blinker and watched C-beams glitter in the dark near the Tannhäuser Gate. All those moments... they'll be gone.

Hauer described this as "opera talk" and "hi-tech speech" with no bearing on the rest of the film, so he "put a knife in it" the night before filming, without Scott's knowledge. After filming the scene with Hauer's version, members of the crew allegedly applauded and cried. In an interview with Dan Jolin, Hauer said that these final lines showed that Batty wanted to "make his mark on existence ... the replicant in the final scene, by dying, shows Deckard what a real man is made of".

== Critical reception and analysis ==
Sidney Perkowitz, writing in Hollywood Science, praised the speech: "If there's a great speech in science fiction cinema, it's Batty's final words." He says that it "underlines the replicant's humanlike characteristics mixed with its artificial capabilities". Jason Vest, writing in Future Imperfect: Philip K. Dick at the Movies, praised the delivery of the speech: "Hauer's deft performance is heartbreaking in its gentle evocation of the memories, experiences, and passions that have driven Batty's short life".

The Guardian writer Michael Newton noted that "in one of the film's most brilliant sequences, Roy and Deckard pursue each other through a murky apartment, playing a vicious child's game of hide and seek. As they do so, the similarities between them grow stronger – both are hunter and hunted, both are in pain, both struggle with a hurt, claw-like hand. If the film suggests a connection here that Deckard himself might still at this point deny, at the very end doubt falls away. Roy's life closes with an act of mercy, one that raises him morally over the commercial institutions that would kill him. If Deckard cannot see himself in the other, Roy can. The white dove that implausibly flies up from Roy at the moment of his death perhaps stretches belief with its symbolism; but for me at least the movie has earned that moment, suggesting that in the replicant, as in the replicated technology of film itself, there remains a place for something human."

After Hauer's death in July 2019, Leah Schade of the Lexington Theological Seminary wrote in Patheos of Batty as a Christ figure. She comments on seeing Batty, with a nail through the palm of his hand, addressing Deckard, who is hanging from one of the beams:

Then, as Deckard dangles from the steel beam of a rooftop after missing his jump across the chasm, Roy appears holding a white dove. He jumps across to Deckard with ease and watches his hunter struggle to hold on. "Quite an experience to live in fear, isn't it? That's what it is to be a slave." Then, just as Deckard's hand slips, Roy reaches out and grabs him – with his nail-pierced hand. He lifts up Deckard and swings him onto the roof in a final act of mercy for the man who had killed his friends and intended to kill him. In that moment, Roy becomes a Christ-like figure, his hand reminiscent of Jesus's own hand nailed to the cross. The crucifixion was a saving act. And Roy's stunning last act – saving Deckard when he did not at all deserve saving – is a powerful scene of grace.

=== Tannhäuser Gate ===
The place named "Tannhäuser Gate" (also written "Tannhauser Gate" and "Tanhauser Gate") is not explained in the film. It possibly derives from Richard Wagner's operatic adaptation of the legend of the medieval German knight and poet Tannhäuser. The term has since been reused in other works of science fiction.

Joanne Taylor, in an article discussing film noir and its epistemology, remarks on the relation between Wagner's opera and Batty's reference, and suggests that Batty aligns himself with Wagner's Tannhäuser, a character who has fallen from grace with men and with God. Both man and God, as she claims, are characters whose fate is beyond their own control.

== Noteworthy references ==
The speech appears as the last track on the film's soundtrack album.

Its influence can be noted in references and tributes, including:

- When David Bowie's half-brother Terry Burns died by suicide in 1985, the note attached to the roses that Bowie (a fan of Blade Runner) sent to his funeral read "You've seen more things than we can imagine, but all these moments will be lost, like tears washed away by the rain. God bless you. —David."
- The lyric "Ships burn off the coast of Orion" appears in the song "Soldier Blue" by the English rock band The Cult, from their 1989 album Sonic Temple.
- Appearing on BBC Radio's Desert Island Discs, Google DeepMind CEO and Nobel laureate in chemistry Demis Hassabis chose this speech as the recording he would most like to take to a desert island. He described seeing Blade Runner in his teens as very formative in inspiring his interest in artificial intelligence.
- The 1998 film Soldier, which was written by Blade Runner co-writer David Peoples and is considered by him to be set in the same universe as Blade Runner, references the scene when Kurt Russell's character is revealed to have fought at the Battles of Tannhauser's Gate and Shoulder of Orion.
- British DJ Paul Oakenfold incorporated the "Tears in Rain" monologue into his 1994 mix album The Goa Mix.
- The EBM/Synthpop band Covenant released a song titled "Like Tears In Rain" on their album United States of Mind in 2000 (released in German as "Der Leiermann").
- In Tony Scott's 2005 film Domino, Keira Knightley's character has a tattoo on the back of her neck that reads, "Tears in the Rain". This was a homage to his brother Ridley Scott, who directed Blade Runner.
- UK metal band Fightstar have several songs inspired by and named after Blade Runner, including a song called "Lost Like Tears in Rain" from their 2005 debut EP, They Liked You Better When You Were Dead.
- Rutger Hauer titled his 2007 autobiography All Those Moments: Stories of Heroes, Villains, Replicants, and Blade Runners. His family quoted the last two sentences of the monologue in his obituary notice.
- The British electronic musician Zomby sampled the monologue in the track "Tears in the Rain" on his album Where Were U in '92? in 2008.
- Swedish rapper Yung Lean sampled the monologue at the end of the track "Lightsaber // Saviour" on his 2013 debut mixtape Unknown Death 2002.
- The Weeknd, a noted fan of the film, released a track entitled "Tears in the Rain" as the closing song of his 2013 debut studio album Kiss Land.
- In the Cyberpunk 2077 video game, Roy Batty's character has a niche at the Columbarium, quoting "Tears in Rain" as its inscription. Additionally, a character resembling Roy Batty can be found sitting atop the Advocet Hotel in-game while holding a dove and a neon sign behind him quoting "Like Tears".
