= List of Blade Runner characters =

Blade Runner is a 1982 American neo-noir science fiction film directed by Ridley Scott, which stars Harrison Ford, Rutger Hauer, Sean Young, and Edward James Olmos. Written by Hampton Fancher and David Peoples, the film is an adaptation of the 1968 novel Do Androids Dream of Electric Sheep? by Philip K. Dick.

Its 2017 sequel, Blade Runner 2049, stars Ryan Gosling and Harrison Ford, with Ana de Armas, Sylvia Hoeks, Robin Wright, Mackenzie Davis, Carla Juri, Lennie James, Dave Bautista and Jared Leto.

Additionally, several other spinoffs have been made that introduce or explain new characters, most notably the 2017 prequel short films Blade Runner Black Out 2022, 2036: Nexus Dawn, 2048: Nowhere to Run; the 2021 television series Blade Runner: Black Lotus (with an upcoming series Blade Runner 2099 scheduled for release in 2026); a 1997 video game; along with sequel novels written by K.W. Jeter.

This article lists notable characters from the Blade Runner franchise.

== Characters in both films ==
=== Rick Deckard ===
Rick Deckard is a "blade runner", a special agent in the Los Angeles police department employed to hunt down and "retire" replicants. His ID number is B-263-54, which is stated twice in both the 1992 Director's Cut and the 2007 Final Cut of the film.

He is the protagonist of Blade Runner, the narrator in its original theatrical release, and appears in Blade Runner 2049. He was played by Harrison Ford.

In the first film, Deckard reluctantly comes out of retirement to carry out an assignment by Captain Harry Bryant. His task is to kill the surviving four out of a renegade group of six replicants from the off-world colonies: Roy Batty, Zhora, Leon, and Pris. He administers the Voight-Kampff test on Dr. Eldon Tyrell's assistant, Rachael, and concludes she is a Nexus-6 replicant since the test takes much longer than normal. Rachael denies it by showing a picture of her as a young child, but Deckard explains to her that she has been implanted with memories from Tyrell's niece. He tries apologizing to her, but Rachael leaves in tears. Later on in the film, Deckard falls in love with her, which she acquiesces to.

In both the Director's and Final Cuts of the film, Deckard daydreams about a unicorn.

He hunts down Zhora, finds her in Taffey Lewis's Snake Pit Bar, and kills her after a chase. Leon ambushes and almost kills Deckard, but is killed by Rachael, saving Deckard. He tracks down Pris to J.F. Sebastian's apartment, killing her before Roy returns. Roy chases him throughout the apartment building and up to its roof. Failing to make a full jump to another building, Deckard hangs onto a beam and is caught by Roy as his fingers slip. Before Roy dies due to his short lifespan, he tells Deckard of the things he has seen, and how they will be "lost in time, like tears in rain." Afterwards, Deckard picks up a unicorn origami Gaff has left behind and flees Los Angeles with Rachael. (Note: Based on the Blade Runner US theatrical release.)

In the second film, a replicant detective named KD6-3.7, or "K" for short, locates him in the ruins of Las Vegas. Deckard is informed that he is the father of the child Rachael gave birth to before dying in childbirth. A replicant enforcer named Luv kidnaps him and takes him to Niander Wallace, the CEO of the Wallace Corporation, who offers him an identical version of Rachael in trade of information on the child's whereabouts. Deckard refuses, noticing an error on the Rachael dupe. Wallace makes Luv kill the dupe and take Deckard off-world to be tortured in order to extract information. While she is transporting him, K saves Deckard and drowns her, K getting severely injured in the process. Deckard is taken by K to his daughter, Dr. Ana Stelline, at her facility, and receives the toy horse from K's childhood memories.

=== Gaff ===
Gaff is a Los Angeles police officer who escorts Deckard throughout his mission. He primarily uses "Cityspeak", a creole of Spanish, French, German, Hungarian, Chinese, Russian and Japanese, which Deckard pretends not to understand. Gaff is never shown participating in Deckard's investigation, preferring to linger in the background crafting origami figures; he appears to have an ambivalent attitude towards the replicants, observing "the other man's dead, Deckard... it's a shame she won't live".

Gaff was played by American actor/director Edward James Olmos.

The sequel novel to Do Androids Dream of Electric Sheep? mentions that Gaff is killed in the line of duty. At the beginning of the novel, Bryant has just returned from the funeral and expresses his distaste for the Cityspeak written on Gaff's headstone.

In the 2017 anime short film Blade Runner Black Out 2022, Gaff reluctantly agrees to hunt down five replicants who escaped from the off-world colony Calantha.

In the sequel film Blade Runner 2049, Gaff is questioned by KD6-3.7 in a retirement home, asking about Deckard's whereabouts.

=== Rachael ===
Rachael
- Blade Runner character
- Portrayed by: Sean Young

In-universe information
- Species: Replicant
- Gender: Female
- Model: NEXUS-7 N7FAA52318

Rachael, sometimes referred to as Rachael Tyrell, was the latest experiment of Eldon Tyrell, and the sole Nexus-7 replicant. He believed that since the replicants had such a limited lifespan, they had little time to develop control of their emotions, causing difficulty in managing these emotions. He believed implanting the replicants with memories would create a cushion that would allow for emotional development, and make them more controllable.

Rachael has the implanted memories of Tyrell's niece, leading her to believe that she is human. It is not revealed in the film how long she has been living, but Tyrell admits that he thinks she is beginning to suspect the truth of her nature.

Tyrell refuses to discuss the issue with Rachael. In desperation, she turns to Deckard, who has been told by Captain Bryant to retire her. Instead, Deckard falls in love with her.

At the end of the film, Rachael and Deckard board an elevator and flee Los Angeles.

In Blade Runner 2049 it is revealed Rachael, as the sole Nexus-7, was given the ability to reproduce by Tyrell. During an apparently routine investigation, Blade Runner Officer K uncovers a box containing bones and hair buried under a tree. The remains are shown to be that of a being who died after a caesarean section, and upon the discovery that the being was a replicant, K is ordered by Lt. Joshi to track down and kill the replicant's child. K later learns the pregnant replicant was Rachael. After capturing Deckard, Niander Wallace designs a physically near-identical copy of Rachael and offers her to Deckard in an attempt to persuade Deckard to reveal the location of the replicants who helped hide his and Rachael's daughter. After Deckard declines, Wallace has the copy killed.

Rachael was played by Sean Young in Blade Runner. In Blade Runner 2049, Rachael was portrayed by actress Loren Peta with Sean Young's facial features de-aged and overlaid via CGI.

== Characters in Blade Runner ==
=== Roy Batty ===
Roy Batty
- Blade Runner character
- Portrayed by: Rutger Hauer

In-universe information
- Species: Replicant
- Gender: Male
- Model: NEXUS-6 N6MAA10816
- Function: Combat, Colonization Defense Prog.
- Physical Level: A
- Mental Level: A

Roy Batty is the leader of the renegade Nexus-6 replicants and the main antagonist of the film. Portrayed by Dutch actor Rutger Hauer, he was activated on January 8, 2016, which makes him 3 years and 10 months old by the time of the events of the film.

He is highly intelligent, fast and skilled at combat and yet still learning how to deal with emotions. He is a combat model, used off-world for military service. He and five other replicants come to Earth hoping to find a way to lengthen their lifespan. He is able to use J. F. Sebastian to get a meeting with Tyrell, the founder of the company and his creator. Tyrell refers to him as his "prodigal son" and tells him his life cannot be extended but he should revel in the life that he has, as he has done and seen things others could only dream of. Batty kills Tyrell and Sebastian.

Deckard retires the remaining replicants and is hunted by a dying Roy. Deckard ends up dangling from a building and is saved from the fall by Roy. As he dies, Roy tells Deckard about the things he has seen and how the memories will be "lost in time, like tears in rain". He smiles, saying, "Time... to die".

In the novel Do Androids Dream of Electric Sheep?, his name was spelled "Roy Baty" and was the leader of the eight replicants who killed their human owners so that they could escape their life of slavery on Mars. Roy was married to Irmgard Baty, another replicant. In the novel, Roy's relationship with Pris, who was his lover in the film, is only one of friendship. In the sequel novel Blade Runner 2: The Edge of Human, incorporating elements from the novel and the screenplay, Roy is one of a series of replicants based on a mercenary of the same name. The template suffered from "neural malformation", which made them unable to experience fear. This might be a reason why replicants of that series were so difficult to kill.

=== Harry Bryant ===
Harry Bryant is the captain of the Rep-Detect department of the Los Angeles Police Department. His job in the film is to deal with a group of escaped Nexus-6 replicants (whom he refers to as "skinjobs") that have landed on Earth. His top Blade Runner, Holden, was in hospital on a medical ventilator after an encounter with the Leon replicant, earlier in the film. Bryant uses thinly veiled threats against Rick Deckard, a retired Blade Runner, to enlist his aid. Deckard's narration in the original theatrical version compares Bryant to the racist cops of the past.

He was played by M. Emmet Walsh.

=== Hannibal Chew ===
Hannibal Chew contracts for the Tyrell Corporation as a genetic engineer. His job is to create the eyes for the replicants, Roy's and Leon's, in this case.

In the film, the replicants visit him while he is working in a freezer. The replicants pressure him into telling them that J. F. Sebastian can get them into Tyrell's inner sanctum.

He was played by James Hong.

=== Dave Holden ===
Dave Holden is the Blade Runner testing new employees at the Tyrell Corporation on the premise that the escaped Replicants might try to infiltrate the company.

During a Voight-Kampff test, Leon shoots Holden and leaves him for dead. Later, Bryant mentions that Holden is alive, but his breathing is assisted by machines.

There were two hospital scenes with Holden and Deckard that were filmed, but not used in the movie. One scene is shown in the documentary On the Edge of Blade Runner. Both scenes appear in the deleted scenes section on the Blade Runner Special Edition DVD.

He was played by Morgan Paull.

=== Leon Kowalski ===
Leon Kowalski
- Blade Runner character
- Portrayed by: Brion James

In-universe information
- Species: Replicant
- Gender: Male
- Model: NEXUS-6 N6MAC41717
- Function: Combat / Loader (Nuc. Fiss.)
- Physical Level: A
- Mental Level: C

Leon Kowalski is a replicant who came to Earth with five others looking to extend their lives. He has an A physical level, which means he has superhuman strength and endurance (according to the Final Cut he was used to load nuclear-heads in the outer space colonies and for front-line soldier duty). Leon is classified mental level C. He does not have the speed of thought that Roy does when it comes to solving problems. He was activated on April 10, 2017, making him 2 years and 7 months old by the time of the film.^{α}

Leon tries to infiltrate the Tyrell Corporation as an employee and undergoes a Voight-Kampff test (designated as V.K. 96/W/9-3H) designed to detect replicants. Confused by the questions, he shoots the tester, Dave Holden. Leon attacks Deckard on the street after seeing him kill Zhora, but is stopped when Rachael shoots him with Deckard's gun.

Leon cherishes photographs of his friends. Unlike Rachael's false photos of her childhood, these include current photos of people who mean something to him.

He was played by Brion James.

=== Taffey Lewis ===
Taffey Lewis is the owner of Taffey's Snake Pit Bar. The bar features music, exotic dancing, and something being smoked in pipes. When Deckard tries questioning him, he dismisses Deckard's threats with a free drink.

He was played by Hy Pyke.

=== Pris Stratton ===
Pris Stratton
- Blade Runner character
- Portrayed by: Daryl Hannah

In-universe information
- Species: Replicant
- Gender: Female
- Model: NEXUS-6 N6FAB21416
- Function: Military / Leisure
- Physical Level: A
- Mental Level: B

Pris Stratton is a "basic pleasure model" incepted on Valentine's Day, 2016, making her the second-oldest of the four fugitive replicants at three years, nine months. She is the girlfriend of Roy Batty and is responsible for gaining J. F. Sebastian's trust. At an A-Physical Level, she is shown to have superhuman endurance and an affinity for gymnastics. Her B-Mental Level puts her at a lower intellectual level than Roy, but higher than Leon. Her punk outfits were inspired by a new wave calendar.

In the film, she sets a trap for Deckard in the Bradbury Building, disguising herself as one of Sebastian's toys and then attacking Deckard with her gymnastic skills. As she rushes Deckard for another attack, he kills her.

Her surname, Stratton, appears in the novel Do Androids Dream of Electric Sheep?, but is never used in the film.

In the sequel novel Blade Runner 2: The Edge of Human, it is suggested that Pris was actually an insane human woman who believed that she was a female replicant.

She was played by Daryl Hannah.

=== J.F. Sebastian ===
J.F. Sebastian is a genetic designer working for Tyrell. He is not allowed to emigrate off-world because he has "Methuselah syndrome". Because of this, he ages faster and has a shorter lifespan, something he has in common with the replicants. He is only 25 years old, but his physical appearance is of a middle-aged man. With the Bradbury Building all to himself, he makes the most of his considerable talents creating automata companions.

He is loosely based on the character J. R. Isidore from the novel Do Androids Dream of Electric Sheep?.

He is approached by Pris, whom Sebastian takes in because he thinks she is homeless, and Roy comes to stay with him soon after. Roy and Pris point out that because of his condition, Sebastian has much in common with them, and argue that if they do not get Tyrell's help to extend their lives, Pris will soon die. Sebastian is playing correspondence chess with Tyrell, and Roy suggests a bold move which gives rise to an opportunity to visit Tyrell and smuggle Roy in. When Tyrell claims that he cannot extend Roy's life, Roy kills him.

Sebastian is seen running away from Roy, who then descends the elevator alone. A police radio message heard by Deckard after Tyrell is killed states that Sebastian's body was also discovered by the police with Tyrell's at the Tyrell Corporation.

The makeup for Sebastian was a "stretch and stipple" technique with no prosthetics.

He was played by William Sanderson.

=== Dr. Eldon Tyrell ===
Dr. Eldon Tyrell is the CEO and founder of Tyrell Corporation. His creations are Replicants, some of whom have been given away as an incentive for people to emigrate to the off-world colonies. Others are used in combat to protect those settlers. Roy Batty, along with J. F. Sebastian, finds Tyrell, and asks him to extend his life beyond the four-year limit built into Nexus-6 replicants. Tyrell claims this request is impossible to satisfy due to the inherent instabilities of replicant genetics. Upon hearing this, Batty kisses Tyrell before gouging out his eyes and crushing his skull with his hands.

He was played by Joe Turkel.

=== Zhora Salome ===
Zhora Salome
- Blade Runner character
- Portrayed by: Joanna Cassidy

In-universe information
- Species: Replicant
- Gender: Female
- Model: NEXUS-6 N6FAB61216
- Function: Retrained (9 Feb., 2018) Polit. Homicide
- Physical Level: A
- Mental Level: B

Zhora Salome is a replicant with an A Physical Level (super-human endurance) and a B Mental Level (intelligence equal to that of Pris), and has been used in murder squads. She was activated on June 12, 2016, making her 3 years and 5 months old. She gets a job as an exotic dancer at Taffey's Bar using an artificial snake, which was the actress's real pet snake. Deckard tracks her down at Taffey's after finding her snake's scale, and she soon realizes that he is dangerous. She attacks him, but Deckard narrowly escapes death when people walk in just before she can choke him with his own tie. Zhora tries to escape by running into a busy street, but Deckard chases her and finally shoots her in the back, "retiring" her.

She was portrayed by Joanna Cassidy.

=== Unnamed replicant(s) ===
According to dialogue spoken by Bryant in the Final Cut of the film, two other unnamed replicants (only one in some versions) were killed while attempting to enter the Tyrell Corporation. The term "Two of them got fried running through an electrical field" used by him when describing their deaths suggests they were stopped by an electrical barrier or security device of some sort. In the theatrical cut of the film, the spoken line is "One of them got fried running through an electrical field" leaving one replicant unaccounted for.

In Hampton Fancher's early drafts of the script, these replicants are named as Mary and Hodge. Mary lives and Hodge is the only replicant fried in the electrical field. Mary was intended to reflect the novel's character of Irmgard Baty, and was meant to be a "mother figure" model of replicant, performing housework and childcare duties, and she was supposed to be reminiscent of the stereotypical housewife of the 1950s. Her incept date is given as November 1, 2017. Mary was to be played by Stacey Nelkin, who had originally tried out for the role of Pris, but Mary's scenes were cut before filming.

== Characters in Blade Runner 2049 ==
=== K ===
K
- Blade Runner 2049 character
- Portrayed by: Ryan Gosling

In-universe information
- Species: Replicant
- Gender: Male
- Model: NEXUS-9 KD6-3.7

KD6-3.7, Officer K, or K for short, is a Nexus-9 replicant model created to obey authority no matter what and work as a "blade runner" for the Los Angeles Police Department, hunting down and "retiring" rogue older replicant models. He was portrayed by Ryan Gosling.

K is aware he is a replicant, and like the rest of his line, was programmed with implanted memories to aid his mental stability—though the new model replicants are fully aware that these fake memories never really happened, to them or other people, but are actually fabrications. K begins to suspect that his implanted memories are actually real. When he starts to believe that he may be Rachael's child, and thus a "real" person, Joi suggests that he needs a real name and picks "Joe" for him. Both the name "K" and the nickname "Joe" are allusions to the protagonist character 'Josef K' in Franz Kafka's existential novel The Trial.

At the end of the film, after sustaining a severe injury from Luv and taking Deckard to his daughter Dr. Stelline, K is last seen on the stairs outside her facility and bleeding.

=== Joi ===
Joi is an artificial intelligence projected as a hologram, designed and commercially sold by Wallace Corporation to be a fully customizable live-in romantic companion. K, an artificial intelligence himself, has a customized Joi copy but attempts to treat her as a person and to have a romantic relationship with her, while wondering about how "real" it can truly be given that she is programmed to like him. At the beginning of the film, K obtains a mobile "emanator" unit for her, a control unit or hologram projector which he can transport in his coat, allowing Joi to accompany him anywhere in the world. Joi is nonetheless intangible and cannot truly interact with her physical surroundings, aside from being able to light K's cigarette and syncing her hologram with Mariette's body and movements while having "sex" with K through Mariette. K's copy of Joi is destroyed when Luv crushes the emanator, and he is later depressed when a giant holographic Joi with factory settings interacts with him, devoid of the memories of his own copy.

She was portrayed by Ana de Armas.

=== Niander Wallace ===
Niander Wallace is the CEO and founder of Wallace Corporation. He is blind, but uses cybernetic implants in his neck to interact with various computers and "see" via flying miniature camera units.

A gifted genetic engineer, his genetically modified crops and livestock solved a global food crisis, giving him enough wealth and political influence to lift the ban on replicant production. Wallace bought out the bankrupt Tyrell Corporation, which had collapsed after several revolts by Nexus-8 replicants. He improved the genetic programming of his new Nexus-9 replicants to the point that they could not disobey humans, even if ordered to commit suicide. Their mental stability was enhanced by the implanting of artificial memories.

By 2049, Earth is suffering from resource depletion and heavy pollution. Wallace Corporation has revitalized the replicant industry and is a major corporation with subsidiaries in associated fields, such as Joi AI holograms. Its products have not only staved off extinction, but allowed humanity to spread off-world. Nonetheless, Wallace is frustrated that humanity has only colonized nine other planets and wants to see it explode across thousands of planets in the galaxy. Lacking the capacity to build enough replicants for such an undertaking, he is convinced that the solution is replicants capable of reproduction on their own. Since the secret of reproduction died with Eldon Tyrell however, he is obsessed with rediscovering it.

He was portrayed by Jared Leto.

=== Ana Stelline ===
Dr. Ana Stelline is a scientist who designs the implanted memories that Wallace Corporation installs into its new replicants: the replicants are aware that these memories are implants they did not personally experience, but their presence drastically improves their mental stability. Empathetic to how replicants are used as slave-labor, Dr. Stelline tries to give them pleasant memories to carry with them, even if they know they are artificial. Due to the complications that can arise, it is forbidden to base memory implants on the real memories of another person: they must be fabrications with no basis in real events. Nonetheless, she secretly sneaks in a few of her best memories into some of the memory implants, as a gift. She actually does not directly work for Wallace Corporation: her "Stelline Corporation" is an independent sub-contractor (Wallace offered to buy her out, but she says she "enjoys her creative freedom").

Ostensibly, Dr. Stelline developed an immune system deficiency as a child, and has spent the past two decades living in a sterile clean-room in her company's compound, keeping her in seclusion from the outside world. Secretly, she is actually the daughter of Deckard and Rachael: living proof that replicants can be capable of reproducing on their own (and making her at least part-replicant through her mother). The replicant underground hid her as an infant and scrambled the records, seeing her birth as a miracle and believing her to be their savior.

K comes to Dr. Stelline's lab to investigate the wooden horse he found, which was in his allegedly fake memory implant. She confirms that it is a real memory, but not who it is from; either K or someone else. The wooden horse was a gift from Deckard to his child, later etched with the child's birth date (the same day that Rachael died, from her grave marker). K suspects the memory of the horse is his own, and he is Rachael's son, but when he meets the replicant underground they reveal that Rachael's child was female. K then realizes that Dr. Stelline was Rachael's child and it was her memory of the horse – because the best memories she gives to replicants like K are actually based on her own.

She was portrayed by Carla Juri.

=== Luv ===
Luv
- Blade Runner 2049 character
- Portrayed by: Sylvia Hoeks

In-universe information
- Species: Replicant
- Gender: Female
- Model: NEXUS-9

Luv is a Nexus-9 replicant and personal assistant to Niander Wallace. He entrusts her as his right-hand agent running day-to-day affairs over Wallace Corporation. She also acts as his personal enforcer, killing police officers including Lt. Joshi in the search for Rachael's child. As KD6-3.7 notes, Wallace was fond enough of her to give her a name and not just a serial number like K has.

Near the end of the film, while trying to transport Deckard off-world to be tortured in order to learn the whereabouts of Rachael's missing child, Luv fights K after he intervenes, gravely wounding him but is drowned shortly afterwards.

She was portrayed by Sylvia Hoeks.

=== Freysa Sadeghpour ===
Freysa Sadeghpour
- Blade Runner 2049 character
- Portrayed by: Hiam Abbass

In-universe information
- Species: Replicant
- Gender: Female
- Model: NEXUS-8 DRV09817

Freysa Sadeghpour is the leader of the replicant underground. An older Nexus-8 model, she took care of Rachael's child, Ana Stelline, after Rachael died in childbirth. Freysa helped to hide Ana and erase the records of her past, but is organizing the underground to one day lead another replicant revolt. At some undisclosed point, Freysa lost her right eye. As seen with Sapper Morton, blade runners by this time remove the right eye of replicants as proof of a successful retirement (death), due to having a serial number embedded below the iris. Whether someone cut out Freysa's eye and left her for dead, or perhaps she cut out her own eye so she cannot be identified, is left unexplained.

Freysa sends Mariette to keep tabs on K, and later saves K after Luv's team from Wallace Corp. captures Deckard. She explains the stakes of the situation to K and her past with Rachael's child, causing him to realize that it is actually Ana. Freysa warns K that if Wallace is able to interrogate Deckard and capture Rachael's child all will be lost, and urges K to kill Deckard before that can happen. K, however, saves Deckard while managing to fake Deckard's death by drowning in the ocean.

She was portrayed by Hiam Abbass.

=== Sapper Morton ===
Sapper Morton
- Blade Runner 2049 character
- Portrayed by: Dave Bautista

In-universe information
- Species: Replicant
- Gender: Male
- Model: NEXUS-8 N8PSD32974 (Note: In Blade Runner Black Out 2022, his serial number is stated to be NK680514, which is inconsistent with Blade Runner 2049.)
- Physical Level: S

Sapper Morton is an older Nexus-8 replicant, living in seclusion on a protein farm in the industrial outliers of Los Angeles. He escaped from Calantha, an off-world colony. Along with his intimidating size and strength, Morton is polite and well-read, collecting antique books. Morton used to be an army medic on the off-world colonies in several campaigns. Morton initially lived in obscurity within the city of Los Angeles, but is discovered when he intervenes to prevent a mugging. This incident forced him to retreat from the city and into the outskirts. K's encounter to "retire" him starts off the events of the film, as it leads K to discover Rachael's skeletal remains buried on Morton's farm. Morton was a member of the replicant underground and, along with Freysa, helped hide Deckard and Rachael's baby – whose birth Morton describes as "a miracle". Using his army medic training, Morton personally conducted an emergency C-section on Rachael to save her baby after Rachael died in childbirth. Morton is contemptuous that K, a replicant himself, is a blade runner hunting his own kind (though K points out that he is a Nexus-9, a replicant model that has been conditioned to obey, and therefore wouldn't have gone underground into hiding).

He was portrayed by Dave Bautista.

=== Mariette ===
Mariette
- Blade Runner 2049 character
- Portrayed by: Mackenzie Davis

In-universe information
- Species: Replicant
- Gender: Female
- Model: Unknown

Mariette is a replicant prostitute, and secretly a member of the replicant underground. Joi wants to experience sex with K, but the holographic projection of her AI lacks physical substance, so she hires Mariette to have sex with him – while overlaying her projection on Mariette's body. Secretly, Freysa instructs Mariette to keep tabs on K by slipping a tracking device into his coat, which enables the replicant underground to save him after Wallace's agents assault him and capture Deckard in the ruins of Las Vegas. Mariette then brings K to meet Freysa personally.

She was portrayed by Mackenzie Davis.

=== Doc Badger ===
Doc Badger is a street-wise fixer on the black market, who talks in Somali. After obtaining a wooden horse that was in his allegedly fake implanted memory, K goes to Doc Badger's shop to have it analyzed. Badger is surprised that it is made of real wood, which is worth a fortune. Upon chemical analysis, he discerns that it was exposed to high radiation levels, allowing K to narrow down his search to the ruins of Las Vegas.

He was portrayed by Barkhad Abdi.

=== Mister Cotton ===
Mister Cotton runs a combination orphanage and salvaging operation in the vast junkyards on the outskirts of Los Angeles, putting the children to work picking apart piles of e-waste for useful scrap-metal. K's investigation leads him to discover that Rachael's child was passed off as a human child at Cotton's orphanage, though he does not remember it. K strong-arms him into revealing his records books, only to discover that someone stole the pages from that year to destroy the evidence.

He was portrayed by Lennie James.

=== Lt. Joshi ===
Lt. Joshi is K's superior on the police force. She does not think replicants like K are as "real" as humans like her, though she does respect K.

She is killed by Luv after refusing to reveal K's location.

She was portrayed by Robin Wright.

=== Coco ===
Coco is a police forensics investigator. He analyzes the bones stored in the ossuary that K found, revealing to him and Joshi that they belonged to a replicant female who died in childbirth (Rachael).

Wallace's agent Luv later ambushes and kills him in his lab to steal Rachael's skeletal remains and return them to Wallace for analysis.

He was portrayed by David Dastmalchian.

=== Nandez ===
Nandez is another police investigator. He is disdainful of Coco's conclusion that Sapper Morton must have cared for Rachael's baby, though Coco points out that Morton clearly cared enough to give her a proper burial.

He was portrayed by Wood Harris.

== Characters in other media ==
=== Blade Runner Black Out 2022 ===
==== Iggy ====
Iggy
- Blade Runner Black Out 2022 character

In-universe information
- Species: Replicant
- Gender: Male
- Incept Date: 30 SEP, 2019
- Model: NEXUS-8 BJ670228
- Function: Combat, intel FADC3-Kalanthia
- Physical Level: A
- Mental Level: S

Iggy Cygnus is a male Nexus-8 replicant and one of five replicants who escaped from Calantha, (Note: Although spelled "Kalanthia" in Blade Runner Black Out 2022, it is repeatedly spelled "Calantha" in Blade Runner 2049 and pronounced as such in both films.) an off-world colony. Uniquely, his mental level is stated to be S, unlike any other replicant. (Note: Sapper Morton's physical level is also shown to be S beforehand despite his absence from the short film. Iggy's mental level reported to be S could be a discrepancy due to Morton's model being inconsistent with Blade Runner 2049.) His philosophy centers around the act of living despite his much longer lifespan than his predecessors. He does not believe replicants have an afterlife.

Before the events of Blade Runner Black Out 2022, Iggy fought in a battle in Calantha. After discovering one of his fallen allies was a replicant through their right eye (serial number shown to be "NX-82/9.6"), Iggy realized that both sides in the battle consisted of only replicants.

Iggy saves Trixie, another female Nexus-8 replicant, from a group of human thugs and recruits her to help steal a gasoline truck and drive it to the Tyrell Corporation's headquarters. He enlists Ren, a human technician, to redirect a test nuclear missile equipped with an electromagnetic pulse above Los Angeles in order to cut the city's power off and cause a blackout. Before it detonates, Iggy uses the stolen truck to blow up all magnetic backups in the Tyrell Corporation's archives to erase remaining electronic data, sealing the corporation's fate and leading to the prohibition of replicant production until the Wallace Corporation wins approval over a decade later. After the blackout, he escapes and removes his right eye, the only thing that designates him as a replicant.

==== Trixie ====
Trixie
- Blade Runner Black Out 2022 character

In-universe information
- Species: Replicant
- Gender: Female
- Incept Date: 05 MAY, 2021
- Model: NEXUS-8 WDV71673

Trixie is a female Nexus-8 replicant who is saved from a group of human thugs by Iggy, another Nexus-8 replicant who escaped from the off-world colony Calantha. Similarly to Pris in Blade Runner, she displays superhuman endurance by using her superior gymnastics abilities to fight. She forms a relationship with Ren, a human technician, two weeks before she is saved by Iggy.

Trixie steals a truck which is used by Iggy who uses it to drive to the Tyrell Corporation headquarters and wipe out their archives. Upon arrival, she evades gunfire from many of its guards until she is distracted by a white dove flying above her whilst somersaulting, getting shot midair and dying soon afterwards.

==== Ren ====
Ren is a sympathetic human technician working for the Tyrell Corporation in charge of launching nuclear missiles. He forms a relationship with Trixie, a female replicant.

Under initial authorization, Ren redirects a test nuclear missile above Los Angeles armed with an electromagnetic pulse which shuts the city's power off. He is caught right before the missile detonates with a gun to his head.

==== Liz ====
Liz
- Blade Runner Black Out 2022 character

In-universe information
- Species: Replicant
- Gender: Female
- Incept Date: 12 MAY, 2012
- Model: NEXUS-8 JR000212
- Function: Combat, Colony Support [...unknown]
- Physical Level: B

Liz is a female replicant briefly seen hanging along with another unnamed replicant after being killed during the "human supremacy movements".

== Notes ==
:^α Replicant serial numbers cover the individual's series, gender, physical and mental levels, and incept date. However, Leon's serial number is an error, as it gives his incept date as April 17, 2017.
