= Cypher (video game) =

2012 video game

Cypher: Cyberpunk Text Adventure
- Developer: Cabrera Brothers
- Publisher: Cabrera Brothers
- Engine: Unity
- Platforms: Windows, OS X
- Release: August 31, 2012
- Genre: Interactive fiction
- Mode: Single-player

Cypher: Cyberpunk Text Adventure is a 2012 cyberpunk interactive fiction video game written by the Cabrera Brothers and released on August 31, 2012. It includes music, sound effects and limited graphical elements. The game was released for Microsoft Windows and OS X.

== Gameplay ==
Gameplay consists of the player reading descriptions of their character's location and surroundings as presented in text form by the game, then inputting their desired actions into the text parser. Further atmospheric detail is provided throughout the game in the form of background music and sound effects, as well as an animated image of the player character on the righthand side of the screen. When the player collects an important object from the game environment, these too are displayed on the right hand side. These images are updated when the object changes, such as when a dirty keycard is cleaned or a device is activated.

== Plot ==
The setting and style of the game has drawn comparisons to classic science fiction works such as Total Recall and Blade Runner. The game is set in NeoSushi City, formerly Tokyo, several years after a catastrophe saw a portion of the moon impact the earth's surface, destroying much of civilisation, including the internet. Corporations rely on individuals who are able to courier data using personal cybernetic implants, and the protagonist, Dogeron "Dog" Kenan, does this for a living. At the opening of the game a deal has gone wrong and he has become a wanted man.

== Development ==
Cypher was the first game that Javier and Carlos Cabrera created independently, though Carlos worked previously as a concept artist on F.E.A.R., Section 8 and Aliens: Colonial Marines. They began work with a story in mind and chose interactive fiction for the genre as they felt it would be the quickest way to develop and publish a game. They trialed a number of text adventure parsers, including Inform and TADS, before settling on Unity3D.

== Release ==
Cypher was released in three different versions: Standard, Collector and Deluxe. The more expensive Collector and Deluxe versions included an expanded range of printable feelies, including a paper art construction set in the Deluxe version. All three versions were released with the game's soundtrack included. In response to several reports of bugs from both users and reviewers, the game has been patched several times since release. A version of Cypher which is compatible with screen readers used by the visually impaired is currently in production along with a second part in pre-production.

== Reception ==
Cypher received a degree of media coverage prior to its release, largely focussing on the unusual choice to publish a text based game in the modern day, with PC Gamer referring to it as a "colourful, text-based throwback." Upon release, reviews were mixed, with much of the criticism directed at the text parser. Adventure Classic Gaming were positive about the game's setting and story but highly critical of the writing and the technical elements of the game, stating that "an awful parser and the lack of basic copyediting stymie any but the most persistent efforts to appreciate the game." Gamezebo were only mildly critical of the text parser, calling it "rather demanding in terms of how you write commands", and summarised their review by saying that "Cypher's well-crafted atmosphere will have you typing like a madman in no time."

After its initial release, however, Cypher was patched a few times to polish the game's text parser and previous grammatical issues. Gaming Enthusiast named Cypher "one of the 30 Best Text-Adventures/Interactive-Fiction Games Over 5 Decades" while Penny Arcade referred to it as "a sexy, violent, neo-noir adventure told through text, clever puzzles, and beautiful art" The Verge ran an article praising the game's art and visual immersion. Armaan Khan of True PC Gaming gave Cypher a positive review, stating that "the story is strong enough to make these typos seem inconsequential. It's strong enough that once I got to the end I felt satisfied because the destination was worth the difficulty of the journey. It's strong enough that I actually played the game a second time, just so I could experience it again. Few games manage to have that effect on me." IndieGames named Cypher one of the Top 10 Indie Adventures of 2012, stating that "Quite shockingly and despite its flaws it actually succeeded; must have been those amazing visuals, that interesting story and the incredible selection of feelies.". IndieLove gave Cypher a positive review stating that "with complementary elements that seek to only tease the brain into stronger imagination, Cypher is a game that has evolved the text adventure genre".
