= Lawrence G. Paull =

American neofuturistic production designer and art director (1938–2019)

- Born: April 13, 1938; Chicago, Illinois, U.S.
- Died: November 10, 2019 (aged 81); La Jolla, California, U.S.
- Occupations: Production designer, art director
- Years active: 1970–2000

Lawrence G. Paull (April 13, 1938 – November 10, 2019) was an American neofuturistic production designer and art director. He was nominated for an Academy Award in the category Best Art Direction for the film Blade Runner.

== Selected filmography ==
- The Hired Hand (1971)
- Star Spangled Girl (1971)
- The Naked Ape (1973)
- Blue Collar (1978)
- In God We Tru$t (1980)
- Blade Runner (1982)
- Romancing the Stone (1984)
- American Flyers (1985)
- Back to the Future (1985)
- Project X (1987)
- Cross My Heart (1987)
- License to Drive (1988)
- Cocoon: The Return (1988)
- Harlem Nights (1989)
- The Last of the Finest (1990)
- Predator 2 (1990)
- City Slickers (1991)
- Unlawful Entry (1992)
- Born Yesterday (1993)
- Naked Gun 33 1/3: The Final Insult (1994)
- Escape from L.A. (1996)
