= Replicant =

Fictional bioengineered android from Blade Runner

Rachael, a replicant played by Sean Young in the 1982 film

A replicant is a fictional bioengineered humanoid featured in the 1982 film Blade Runner and the 2017 sequel Blade Runner 2049. In the films, replicants are physically indistinguishable from adult human beings and can possess superhuman strength and intelligence depending on their design. A replicant can be detected by means of the fictional Voight-Kampff test in which emotional responses are provoked; a replicant's nonverbal responses differ from those of a human. Failing the test leads to execution, which is euphemistically referred to as "retiring".

Several models of replicants are referred to in the two Blade Runner films. The first seen, the Nexus-6, has a four-year lifespan. The successor model, the Nexus-7, is a limited experimental model with the ability to procreate. Nexus-8 and Nexus-9 replicants have open-ended lifespans. The Nexus-9 line was incapable of disobeying human orders.

== Origin of the term ==
In his novel Do Androids Dream of Electric Sheep? (the inspiration for Blade Runner), Philip K. Dick used the term android (or "andy"), but director Ridley Scott wanted a new term to avoid audience preconceptions. As David Peoples was re-writing the screenplay, he consulted his daughter, who was involved in microbiology and biochemistry, who suggested the term "replicating", the biological process of a cell making a copy of itself. From that, either Peoples or Scott came up with replicant, and it was inserted into Hampton Fancher's screenplay. Blade Runner media also used the terms "skinjob" and "doll" as pejoratives for replicants.

== Fictional history ==
=== Blade Runner ===
Before the events of the film, replicants became illegal on Earth after a bloody off-world mutiny. Six replicants escaped the off-world colonies, killing 23 people and taking a shuttle to Earth; the film focuses on the pursuit of the replicants by Rick Deckard, a type of fictional police officer called a "Blade Runner", who investigates, tests, and executes replicants.

Escaped replicants (all Nexus-6 models):

- Roy Batty (played by Rutger Hauer), a self-sufficient combat model for the colonization defence program
- Pris Stratton (played by Daryl Hannah), a "basic pleasure model" for military personnel
- Zhora Salome (played by Joanna Cassidy), "trained for an off-world kick murder squad"
- Leon Kowalski (played by Brion James), a combat model or loader of nuclear fission materials
- An unnamed replicant—"Hodge" in early versions of the screenplay—was killed in an electrical field at the Tyrell Corporation
- The sixth replicant was named "Mary" in early versions of the screenplay. The only mention of this replicant occurs in the 2007 "Final Cut" version — Captain Bryant's dialogue has been fixed to say that two replicants were killed by an electric field at the Tyrell Corporation; in previous versions of the film, he states it was only one replicant.

Other replicants:

- Rachael, (played by Sean Young) is a prototype replicant, with implanted memories from Eldon Tyrell's niece. The sequel film further elaborates on this by revealing she was designed as a test run for a replicant that can become pregnant.

While Deckard discusses Rachael with Tyrell, Tyrell states that to better control replicants he started to implant false memories to give them the years of experiences that humans take for granted, creating a "cushion or pillow for their emotions."

Nexus-6 units were designed to have a four-year lifespan to avoid emotional development, and all attempts to increase a replicant's lifespan have resulted in death. According to Deckard, a normal replicant can usually be discovered using the Voight-Kampff test within 20–30 questions, though Rachael answers over one hundred questions before Deckard determines she is a replicant.

The second film further develops Rachael's origin and gives significantly more details about her radical design. It revealed that she was an experimental model of replicant with a high percentage of human organs, including human reproductive organs, and that Rachael conceived a child with Deckard. As Rachael died during childbirth, her possible survival beyond the four years was undetermined.

=== Blade Runner 2049 ===
The sequel, Blade Runner 2049, is set thirty years after the original. In the intervening 30 years, several new replicant lines were introduced.

The sequel retroactively establishes that Rachael was part of a short-lived prototype line of replicants designated Nexus-7, which was not only intended as a test to make replicants more mentally stable with implanted memories, but also to develop replicants capable of procreation. Rachael died in childbirth in 2021, and the child was hidden by the Replicant Underground. Tyrell was killed during the events of the first film in November 2019, and the secret of producing replicants capable of procreation died with him.

In 2020, the Tyrell Corporation introduced the Nexus-8 replicant, whose lifespans were not limited to four years. The Nexus-8 went into mass production, but a new wave of replicant rebellions occurred, culminating in rogue Nexus-8 replicants detonating a nuclear weapon in orbit over the western United States to create an electromagnetic pulse. The pulse destroyed most records about replicants, making it difficult for humans to track them down on Earth, but the attack led to mass purges and the complete shutdown of Nexus-8 production (though many existing units were able to go into hiding in the chaos).

In 2036, genetic engineer Niander Wallace designed a new line of Nexus-9 replicants. They also have an open lifespan, but were designed to be unable to resist orders given by a human. The demonstrated effectiveness of Nexus-9 programming, combined with the solving of a global food crisis, allowed for a successful push for the ban on replicant production to be lifted.

By 2049, Nexus-9 replicants are extensively used across Earth and the off-world colonies. Special police units are tasked with tracking down any that might go rogue, as well as any remaining Nexus-8s still in hiding (Nexus-7 was never mass-produced, and all the Nexus-6 models died of old age decades before). These police units are once again called Blade Runners, but are now composed of self-aware replicants with implanted memories, though they are fully aware that they are replicants and that their memories are artificial.

== Ambiguity over Deckard's humanity ==
A primary element of the Blade Runner film is the ambiguity over whether the protagonist, Deckard, is a human or a replicant. This ties into one of the central themes of the film: the nature of humanity. Ultimately, the important point is not whether Deckard is a replicant but that the ambiguity blurs the line between humans and replicants.

=== Creator opinions ===
Harrison Ford, who played Deckard in the film, has said that he did not think Deckard was a replicant, and that he and director Ridley Scott had discussions that ended in the agreement that the character was human. Author Will Brooker has written that the unicorn dream may not be unique to Deckard and that it may be a personal touch added to some or all of the Nexus-6 replicants' brains. From this, one might also infer that Gaff is a replicant and shares the same embedded memory.

According to several interviews with director Ridley Scott, Deckard is a replicant. When asked in October 2012 about the possibility of a Blade Runner sequel, Scott said, "It's not a rumor—it's happening. With Harrison Ford? I don't know yet. Is he too old? Well, he was a Nexus-6, so we don't know how long he can live. And that's all I'm going to say at this stage."

Paul Sammon, author of Future Noir: The Making of Blade Runner, has suggested in interviews that Deckard may be a Nexus-7 model, which possesses no superhuman strength or intelligence but does have neurological features that complete the illusion of humanity. Sammon also suggests that Nexus-7 replicants may not have a set lifespan (i.e., they could be immortal, ruling out the lifespan as a determining trait). He goes on to propose that Scott thought it would be more provocative to imply that Deckard is a replicant.

=== In-universe evidence ===
In Do Androids Dream of Electric Sheep?, Deckard was subjected to the Voight-Kampff test and passed, marking him as a human, though Rachael's near-passing the test casts doubt on its infallibility. He collects photographs, yet has no obvious family beyond a reference to his ex-wife (who called him a "cold fish"). The film's Supervising Editor Terry Rawlings remembers that Scott "purposefully put Harrison in the background of the shot, and slightly out of focus, so that you'd only notice his eyes were glowing if you were paying attention… Ridley himself may have definitely felt that Deckard is a replicant, but still, by the end of the picture, he intended to leave it up to the viewer."

The sequel, Blade Runner 2049, revisited the question while leaving the answer deliberately ambiguous. The film reveals that Deckard was able to conceive a child with Rachael, and this was possible because she was an experimental prototype (designated Nexus-7), the first and only attempt to design a replicant model capable of procreation. Niander Wallace, CEO of the company that produced replicants, captures Deckard and muses that his falling in love with Rachael seemed too perfect, suggesting that Deckard was designed to fall in love with Rachael as part of Tyrell's experiment to develop replicants that can procreate, but with Tyrell dead and the records destroyed, he will never know.

== See also ==
- Homunculus
- Artificial gene synthesis
- Bottom-up engineering of living artificial cell

== Bibliography ==
- Glaser, Horst Albert and Rossbach, Sabine: The Artificial Human, Frankfurt/M., Bern, New York 2011. ISBN 9783631578087.
