= Versions of Blade Runner =

Seven cuts of the 1982 Ridley Scott film

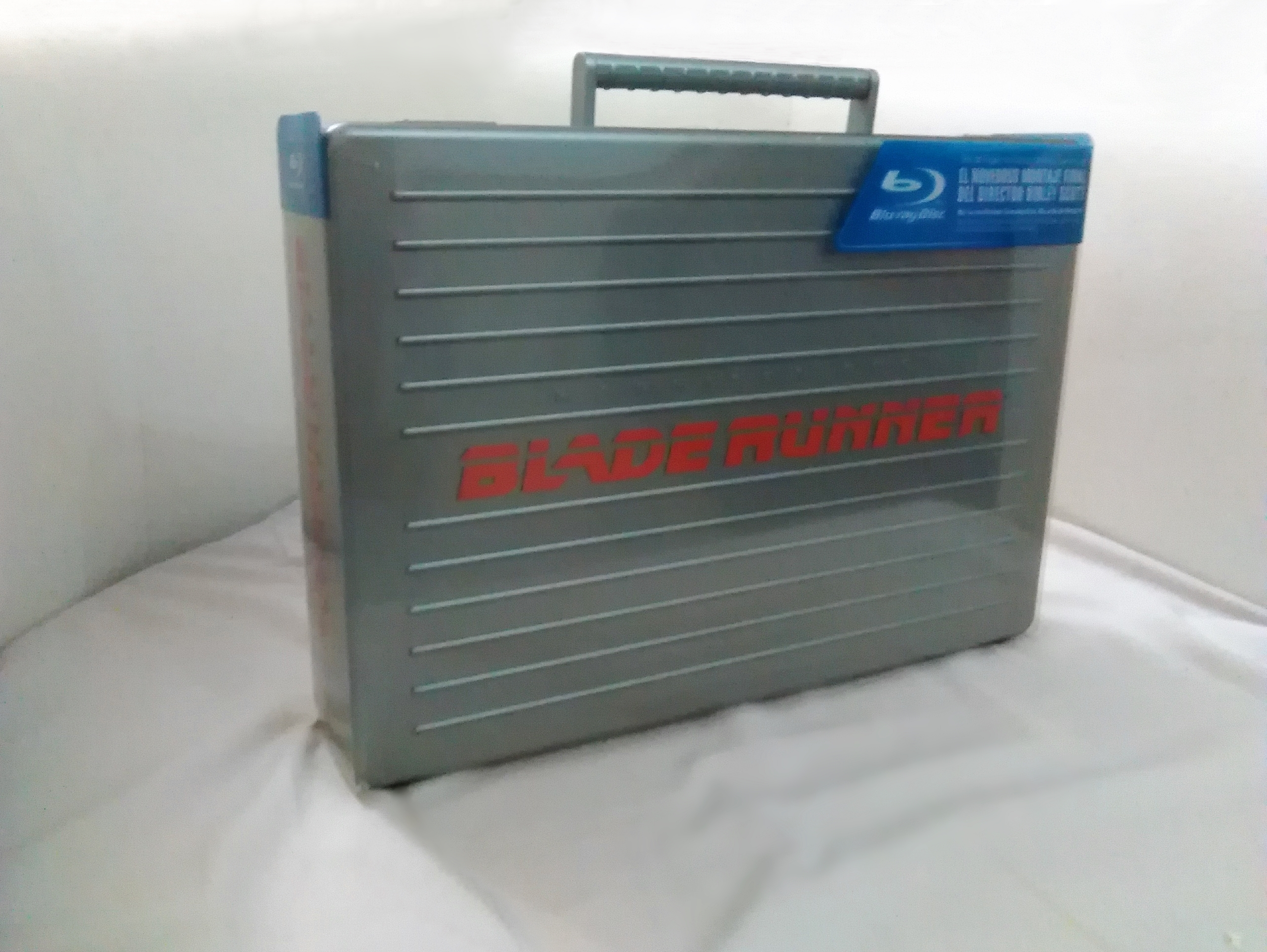
The briefcase of the Five-Disc Ultimate Collector's Edition on Blu-ray

Seven versions of Ridley Scott's 1982 science fiction film Blade Runner have been shown, either to test audiences or theatrically. The best known versions are the Workprint, the US Theatrical Cut, the International Cut, the Director's Cut and the Final Cut. These five versions are included in the 2007 five-disc Ultimate Collector's Edition, the 2012 30th-Anniversary Collector's Edition, and the 2017 4K Ultra HD Special Edition releases.

There also exists the San Diego Sneak Preview Cut, which was shown once at a preview screening and the US Broadcast Cut, which was edited for television broadcast. In the 2007 documentary Dangerous Days: The Making of Blade Runner, there is a reference to director Ridley Scott presenting an eighth version, a nearly four-hour-long "early cut", that was shown only to studio personnel. The following is a timeline of these versions.

== Versions ==
=== Workprint prototype (1982) ===
The workprint version (1982, 113 minutes) was shown to test audiences in Denver and Dallas in March 1982. It was also seen in 1990 and 1991 in Los Angeles and San Francisco as an Original Director's Cut without the approval of director Ridley Scott. Negative responses to the test previews led to the modifications resulting in the American theatrical version, while positive response to the showings in 1990 and 1991 pushed the studio to approve work on an official director's cut. This version was re-released as part of the five-disc Ultimate Edition in 2007 with a new transfer of the last known print in existence, with the picture and sound quality restored as much as possible, though still in rough condition compared to other released versions.

=== San Diego sneak preview (1982) ===
A San Diego sneak preview shown only once in May 1982. This version is nearly identical to the 1982 American theatrical, except that it included three scenes not shown before or since. The scenes were not part of the Final Cut version (2007) and include a scene introducing Batty in a VidPhon booth, a shot of Deckard reloading his gun after Batty broke his fingers and a scene where Deckard and Rachael ride into the sunset.

=== American theatrical release (1982) ===
The 1982 American theatrical released by the studio included the "happy ending" as well as the addition of Harrison Ford's voiceover. Although several different versions of the script had included a narration of some sort to clarify the narrative, Harrison Ford and Ridley Scott had decided to add filmed scenes to provide the information. Financiers rewrote and inserted narration during post-production after test audience members indicated difficulty understanding the film. Scott did not have final cut privilege for the version released to cinemas. Ford said in 1999, "I contested it mightily at the time. It was not an organic part of the film". It has been suggested that Ford intentionally performed the voice-over badly, in the hope it would not be used. In a 2002 interview with Playboy, he said, "I delivered it to the best of my ability, given that I had no input. I never thought they'd use it. But I didn't try and sandbag it. It was simply bad narration".

The "Happy Ending" refers to the scene after Deckard and Rachael leave the apartment. Gaff spares Rachael's life, allowing her and Deckard to escape the nauseating confines of Los Angeles. They drive away into a natural landscape, and Deckard's voice-over narrative explains that Gaff's words ("It's too bad she won't live. But then again who does?") do not ring true, since Rachael does not have the four-year limit of the other replicants.

The film's narration was captioned as an internal monologue in the 1982 comic adaptation written by Archie Goodwin and published by Marvel Comics.

=== International theatrical (1982) ===
The International Cut (1982, 117 minutes)—also known as the "Criterion Edition" or unrated version—included three more violent action scenes than the American theatrical. It was distributed in Europe, Australia, and Asia via theatrical and local Warner Home Video releases. It was later released on VHS and The Criterion Collection laserdisc in North America and re-released in 1992 as a "10th-Anniversary Edition".

=== The Director's Cut (1992) ===
The Ridley Scott-approved Director's Cut (1992, 116 minutes) was prompted by the unauthorized 1990 and 1991 theatrical release of the workprint version of the movie. The Director's Cut contained significant changes from the theatrical workprint version. Scott provided extensive notes and consultation to Warner Bros. Pictures, although film preservationist/restorer Michael Arick was put in charge of creating the Director's Cut.

In October 1989, Arick discovered a 70 mm print of Blade Runner at the Todd-AO vaults while searching for soundtrack masters for other films. Some time later, the print was rediscovered by two film collectors at the same vault while searching for footage from The Alamo.

When the Cineplex Odeon Fairfax Theater in Los Angeles learned of this discovery, the theater management got permission from Warner Bros. to screen the print for a film festival set for May 1990. Until the screening, no one had been aware that this print was the workprint version. Owing to this surprise, Warner Bros. booked more screenings of the advertised "Director's Cut" of Blade Runner in 15 US cities.

Ridley Scott publicly disowned this workprint version of the film as a "director's cut" saying that it was roughly edited, lacked a key scene and the climax did not feature the score composed for the film by Vangelis. (It featured a temporary track using Jerry Goldsmith's score from Planet of the Apes.) In response to Scott's dissatisfaction, Warner Bros. pulled theatrical screenings of the workprint in some cities, though it played at the NuArt Theater in Los Angeles and the Castro Theatre in San Francisco beginning in late 1991.

Because of the sold-out screenings of the workprint (and to screenings of the theatrical cut in Houston and Washington, D.C.) and to the film's resurgent cult popularity in the early '90s, Warner Bros. decided to assemble a definitive director's cut of the film—with direction from Scott—for an official theatrical re-release in 1992. In addition to fleshing out several scenes, three big changes were made to the original theatrical cut:

- The removal of Deckard's thirteen explanatory voice-overs.
- The insertion of a dream sequence of a unicorn running through a forest at minute 42.
- The removal of the studio-imposed "happy ending", including some associated visuals which had originally run under the film's end-credits. In this version the film ends when the elevator doors close as Deckard and Rachael leave.

In 2000, Harrison Ford gave his view on the director's cut of the film, where he said that, although he thought it was "spectacular", it did not "move him at all". He gave a brief reason "They haven't put anything in, so it's still an exercise in design". In 2021, Ridley Scott said on Marc Maron's podcast that the main incentive to alter the film was an idea for the sequel, which would reframe protagonist Rick Deckard as a replicant capable of reproducing.

=== The Final Cut (2007) ===
Ridley Scott's Final Cut (2007, 117 minutes) or the 25th-Anniversary Edition, briefly released by Warner Bros. Pictures theatrically on October 5, 2007 and then released on DVD, HD DVD, and Blu-ray in December 2007 (UK December 3; US December 18) is the only version over which Ridley Scott had artistic control, as the Director's Cut production did not place Scott in charge. In conjunction with the Final Cut, documentary and other materials were produced for the home video releases, culminating in a five-disc "Ultimate Collector's Edition" release by Charles de Lauzirika.

Scott found time in mid-2000 to help assemble a final and definitive version of the film with restoration producer Charles de Lauzirika, which was only partially completed in mid-2001 before legal and financial problems forced a halt to the work.

After several years of legal disputes, Warner Bros. announced in 2006 that it had finally secured full distribution rights to the film, and that there would be a three-stage release of the film:

1. A digitally remastered single-disc re-release of the 1992 director's cut was released on September 5, 2006, in the United States, on October 9, 2006, in Ireland and the UK, and in the following months in continental Europe. It contained a trailer for the final cut.
2. Ridley Scott's Final Cut of the film began a limited theatrical release in New York and Los Angeles on October 5, 2007; in Washington, D.C. at the Uptown Theatre on October 26, 2007; Chicago on November 2, 2007; in Toronto on November 9, 2007, at Theatre D Digital's Regent Theatre; Sydney, Australia at the Hayden Orpheum on November 8, 2007; Melbourne, Australia on November 15, 2007 at the Astor Theatre; Brookline at the Coolidge Corner Theater on November 16, 2007, and Austin, Texas on November 18, 2007.
3. A multi-disc box set was released on the DVD, HD DVD and Blu-ray Disc formats.

The five-disc set was released in Europe on December 3, 2007, and in the US on December 18, 2007. Two-disc and four-disc sets were also released, containing some of the features of the five-disc set.

On November 10, 2008, The Final Cut premiered on Syfy. A DVD featurette titled All Our Variant Futures profiled the making of the Final Cut version, including behind-the-scenes footage of Harrison Ford's son, Ben Ford, and the filming of new scenes for the Final Cut. According to the documentary, Joanna Cassidy made the suggestion to re-film Zhora's death scene while being interviewed for the Dangerous Days: Making Blade Runner documentary, and footage of her making this suggestion is inter-cut with footage of her attending the later digital recording session. The Final Cut contains the original full-length version of the unicorn dream, which had never been in any version, and has been restored. All of the additional violence and alternative edits from the international cut have been inserted. The Final Cut was re-released on Ultra HD Blu-ray on September 5, 2017, (one month prior to the theatrical release of Blade Runner 2049). This release includes standard Blu-ray editions of The Final Cut along with the Dangerous Days documentary on DVD.

== See also ==
- List of adaptations of works by Philip K. Dick
