= Blade Runner (disambiguation) =

Blade Runner is a 1982 science-fiction film starring Harrison Ford and directed by Ridley Scott.

Blade Runner or Bladerunner may also refer to:

== People ==
- Oscar Pistorius (born 1986), South African athlete known as "the Blade Runner"

== Arts, entertainment, and media ==
=== Television ===
- Blade Runner: Black Lotus, a 2021 anime

=== Films ===
- Blade Runner (franchise)
- Blade Runner 2049 (2017), its sequel, directed by Denis Villeneuve

=== Soundtracks ===
- Blade Runner (soundtrack), the original soundtrack to the 1982 film, composed by Vangelis
- Blade Runner 2049 (soundtrack), soundtrack to the 2017 film, composed by Hans Zimmer and Benjamin Wallfisch

=== Literature ===
- Blade Runner (1982), a movie tie-in edition of Philip K. Dick's novel Do Androids Dream of Electric Sheep? (1968), upon which Scott's film is based
- Blade Runner: A Story of the Future (1982), a novelization of the film, written by Les Martin
- Blade Runner novel trilogy, written by K. W. Jeter
  - Blade Runner 2: The Edge of Human (1994)
  - Blade Runner 3: Replicant Night (1996)
  - Blade Runner 4: Eye and Talon (2000)
- A Marvel Comics Super Special: Blade Runner or Blade Runner, a 1982 comic book
- The Bladerunner (1974), a novel by Alan E. Nourse
  - Blade Runner (a movie) (1979), a novella by William S. Burroughs based upon his film treatment of Nourse's novel

=== Video games ===
- Blade Runner (1985 video game), a computer game for the Amstrad CPC, Commodore 64, and ZX Spectrum
- Blade Runner (1997 video game), a PC video game

=== Tabletop games ===
- Blade Runner: The Roleplaying Game, a tabletop roleplaying game (2023)

== Sport ==
- The Blade Runners, a professional wrestling tag team
- BladeRunners Ice Complex, a hockey facility in Pennsylvania

== Vigilante groups ==
- "Blade Runners", a vigilante group based in London which runs a campaign of organized vandalism against ULEZ infrastructure.
