= Do Androids Dream of Electric Sheep? (disambiguation) =

Do Androids Dream of Electric Sheep? is a science fiction novel by American writer Philip K. Dick.

Do Androids Dream of Electric Sheep? may also refer to:

- Do Androids Dream of Electric Sheep? (comic book)
- Do Androids Dream of Electric Sheep?: Dust To Dust

== See also ==
- Do Robots Dream of Electric Sheep? a remix of the album Science Fiction
- Blade Runner (disambiguation)
