= Blade Runner (franchise) =

American science fiction media franchise

- Official franchise logo
- Created by: Philip K. Dick
- Original work: Do Androids Dream of Electric Sheep? (1968)
- Owner: Alcon Entertainment (Note: The original 1982 film is currently owned by Warner Bros. Entertainment.)
- Years: 1968–present

Print publications
- Novels: Do Androids Dream of Electric Sheep? (1968); A Story of the Future and alone men (1982); The Edge of Human (1995); Replicant Night (1996); Eye and Talon (2000)
- Comics: Blade Runner (1982); Do Androids Dream of Electric Sheep? (2009); Dust to Dust (2010); Blade Runner 2019 (2019); Blade Runner 2029 (2020); Blade Runner Origins (2021); Blade Runner 2039 (2022); Blade Runner: Tokyo Nexus (2024)

Films and television
- Films: Blade Runner (1982); Blade Runner 2049 (2017)
- Short films: 2036: Nexus Dawn (2017); 2048: Nowhere to Run (2017); Blade Runner Black Out 2022 (2017)
- Television series: Blade Runner 2099 (2026)
- Animated series: Blade Runner: Black Lotus (2021)

Games
- Role-playing: Blade Runner: The Roleplaying Game (2023)
- Video games: Blade Runner (1985); Blade Runner (1997); Blade Runner: Revelations (2018); Blade Runner 2033: Labyrinth (TBA)

Audio
- Soundtracks: Blade Runner (1982); Blade Runner (1997); Blade Runner 2049 (2017); Blade Runner: Black Lotus (Original Television Soundtrack) (2021)

Blade Runner is an American cyberpunk media franchise originating from the 1968 novel Do Androids Dream of Electric Sheep? by Philip K. Dick, featuring the character of Rick Deckard. The book has been adapted into several media, including films, comics, a stage play, and a radio serial. The first film adaptation was Blade Runner, directed by Ridley Scott in 1982. Although the film initially underperformed at the American box office, it became a cult classic, and has had a significant influence on science fiction. A novelization and a comic adaptation of the film were released in the same year. From 1995 to 2000, three novels serving as sequels to both Blade Runner and the original novel were written by K. W. Jeter, a friend of Dick's. A film sequel to Blade Runner, Blade Runner 2049, was released in 2017. To celebrate the 30th anniversary of Blade Runner in 2012, a short film was released, and in the lead up to the release of Blade Runner 2049, several more short films detailing events that occurred between 2019 and 2049 were released. The influence of the franchise has helped spawn the cyberpunk subgenre.

Since 2011, Blade Runner is a franchise owned in all formats of media by Alcon Entertainment.

== Fictional universe ==
=== Replicants ===
"Electric sheep. But only sometimes."

— Siri – Response to any dream-related question.
Included by Apple Inc. as a tribute to replicants and the concept of AI as a whole.

A replicant is a bioengineered or biorobotic android in the Blade Runner franchise. Virtually identical to adult humans, replicants typically have superior strength, agility, and variable intelligence depending on the model. Because of their similarity to humans, a replicant can only be detected by means of the Voight-Kampff test in which emotional responses are provoked; replicants' responses differ from humans' responses. Nexus 6 replicants also have a safety mechanism, namely a four-year lifespan, to prevent them from developing empathic cognition and therefore immunity to a Voight-Kampff machine. Philip K. Dick's novel Do Androids Dream of Electric Sheep?, the inspiration for Blade Runner, used the term android (or "andy") rather than "replicant"; Blade Runner director Ridley Scott requested a new, separate term that did not have preconceptions from David Peoples. As Peoples was rewriting the film's screenplay he consulted his daughter, who was then involved in biochemistry and microbiology, who suggested the term "replicating", the biological process of a cell making a copy of itself. From that, either Peoples or his daughter (each would recall later it was the other) coined the term replicant, which was inserted into Hampton Fancher's screenplay.

=== Blade runners ===
In the films and television series, blade runners are plainclothes police officers tasked with hunting and killing replicants. The title character is blade runner Rick Deckard of the Los Angeles Police Department's Replicant Detection Unit. The term comes not from the Philip K. Dick novel but rather a 1979 novella by William S. Burroughs, called Blade Runner (a movie), itself an adaptation of a Burroughs screenplay of the 1974 novel The Bladerunner by Alan E. Nourse. Scott optioned the title from Burroughs after it was suggested by screenwriter Hampton Fancher.

=== Voight-Kampff machine ===
A very advanced form of lie detector that measures contractions of the iris muscle and the presence of invisible airborne particles emitted from the body. The bellows were designed for the latter function and give the machine the menacing air of a sinister insect. The VK is used primarily by blade runners to determine if a suspect is truly human by measuring the degree of his empathic response through carefully worded questions and statements.

— Description from the original 1982 Blade Runner press kit.

The Voight-Kampff machine is a fictional interrogation tool, originating in the 1968 novel Do Androids Dream of Electric Sheep?. The Voight-Kampff is a polygraph-like machine used by blade runners to determine whether or not an individual is a replicant. It measures bodily functions such as blush response, respiration, heart rate and eye movement in response to questions dealing with empathy. In the film two replicants take the test, Leon and Rachael, and Deckard tells Tyrell that it usually takes 20 to 30 cross-referenced questions to distinguish a replicant; in contrast with the book, where it is stated it only takes "six or seven" questions to make a determination. In Blade Runner, it takes Deckard more than one hundred questions to determine that Rachael is a replicant.

=== Spinner ===
Spinner is a nickname given for the type of flying car featured throughout the Blade Runner universe; they are seen in Blade Runner and Blade Runner 2049. The police variant of the vehicle in the original movie features a small "Spinner" logo attached to driver's door between "caution" and Japanese "警察" labels; today the model can be seen in Seattle MoPOP. Since the logo was not clearly visible on low-resolution home-video copies, it was often misspelled as "Skimmer", before high-resolution editions of the movie were released. These vehicles can drive on the ground as a normal car, take off vertically, cruise and hover. Spinners use an unspecified form of jet propulsion, similar to Vertical Take-Off and Landing aircraft. In Blade Runner, they are used extensively by the LAPD to survey the general population, as well as by wealthy entrepreneurs. The Spinner was designed by Syd Mead. The Spinner has been replicated in films such as Back to the Future Part II, The Fifth Element and the Star Wars prequel trilogy.

== Background ==
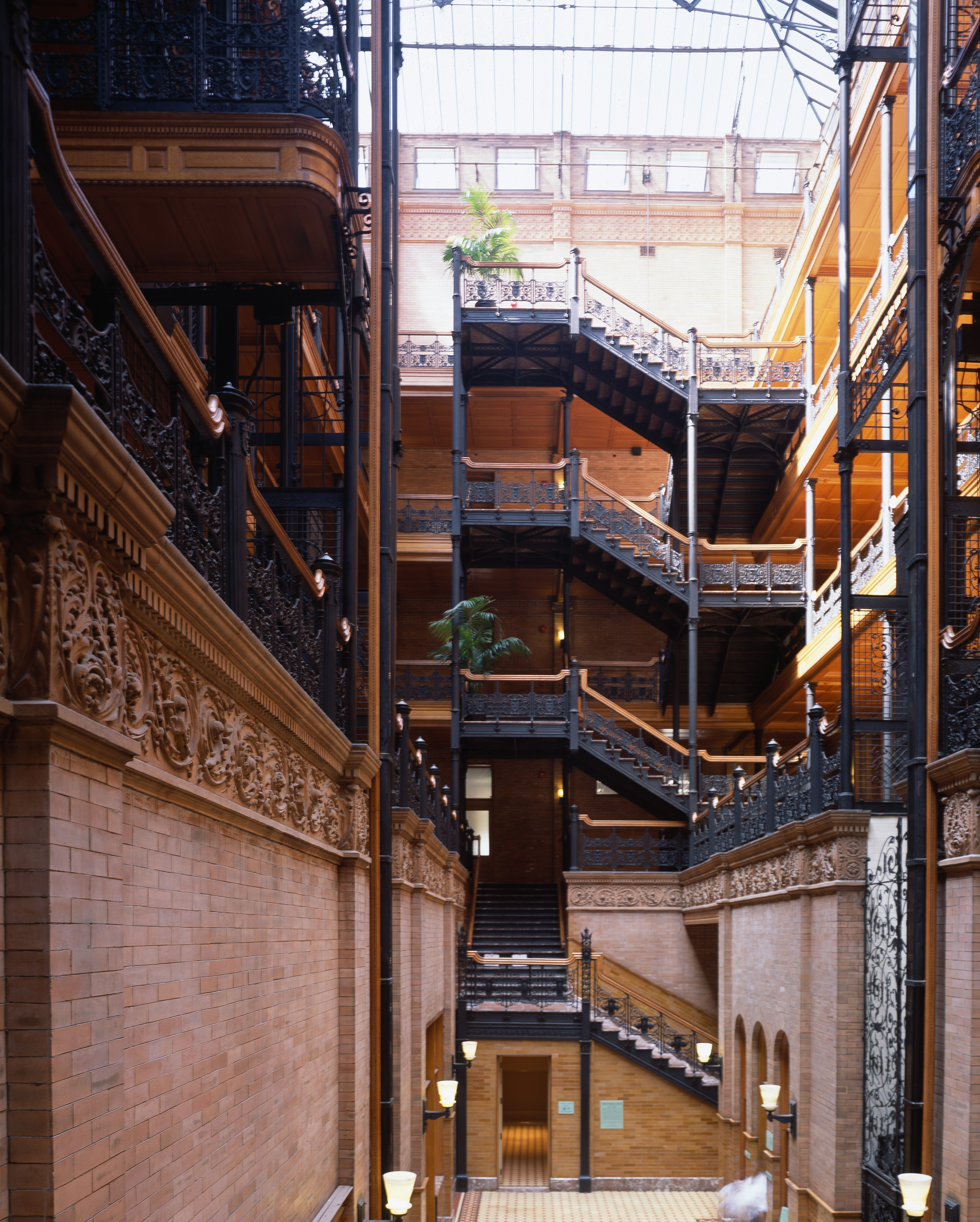
The Bradbury Building in Los Angeles was a filming location.

Interest in adapting Philip K. Dick's novel Do Androids Dream of Electric Sheep? developed shortly after its 1968 publication. Director Martin Scorsese was interested in filming the novel, but never optioned it. Producer Herb Jaffe optioned it in the early 1970s, but Dick was unimpressed with the screenplay written by Herb's son Robert: "Jaffe's screenplay was so terribly done ... Robert flew down to Santa Ana to speak with me about the project. And the first thing I said to him when he got off the plane was, 'Shall I beat you up here at the airport, or shall I beat you up back at my apartment?'"

The screenplay by Hampton Fancher was optioned in 1977. Producer Michael Deeley became interested in Fancher's draft and convinced director Ridley Scott to film it. Scott had previously declined the project, but after leaving the slow production of Dune, wanted a faster-paced project to take his mind off his older brother's death. He joined the project on February 21, 1980, and managed to push up the promised Filmways financing from US$13 million to $15 million. Fancher's script focused more on environmental issues and less on issues of humanity and religion, which are prominent in the novel and Scott wanted changes. Fancher found a cinema treatment by William S. Burroughs for Alan E. Nourse's novel The Bladerunner (1974), titled Blade Runner (a movie). (Note: Some editions of Nourse's novel use the two-word spacing Blade Runner, as does the Burroughs book.) Scott liked the name, so Deeley obtained the rights to the titles. Eventually he hired David Peoples to rewrite the script and Fancher left the job over the issue on December 21, 1980, although he later returned to contribute additional rewrites.

Having invested over $2.5 million in pre-production, as the date of commencement of principal photography neared, Filmways withdrew financial backing. In ten days Deeley had secured $21.5 million in financing through a three-way deal between The Ladd Company (through Warner Bros.), the Hong Kong-based producer Sir Run Run Shaw and Tandem Productions.

Philip K. Dick became concerned that no one had informed him about the film's production, which added to his distrust of Hollywood. After Dick criticized an early version of Hampton Fancher's script in an article written for the Los Angeles Select TV Guide, the studio sent Dick the David Peoples rewrite. Although Dick died shortly before the film's release, he was pleased with the rewritten script and with a 20-minute special effects test reel that was screened for him when he was invited to the studio. Despite his well-known skepticism of Hollywood in principle, Dick enthused to Ridley Scott that the world created for the film looked exactly as he had imagined it. He said, "I saw a segment of Douglas Trumbull's special effects for Blade Runner on the KNBC-TV news. I recognized it immediately. It was my own interior world. They caught it perfectly." He also approved of the film's script, saying, "After I finished reading the screenplay, I got the novel out and looked through it. The two reinforce each other, so that someone who started with the novel would enjoy the movie and someone who started with the movie would enjoy the novel." The motion picture was dedicated to Dick. Principal photography of Blade Runner began on March 9, 1981, and ended four months later.

In 1992, Harrison Ford revealed, "Blade Runner is not one of my favorite films. I tangled with Ridley." Apart from friction with the director, Ford also disliked the voiceovers: "When we started shooting it had been tacitly agreed that the version of the film that we had agreed upon was the version without voiceover narration. It was a f**king [sic] nightmare. I thought that the film had worked without the narration. But now I was stuck re-creating that narration. And I was obliged to do the voiceovers for people that did not represent the director's interests." "I went kicking and screaming to the studio to record it." The narration monologues were written by an uncredited Roland Kibbee.

In 2006, Scott was asked "Who's the biggest pain in the arse you've ever worked with?", he replied: "It's got to be Harrison ... he'll forgive me because now I get on with him. Now he's become charming. But he knows a lot, that's the problem. When we worked together it was my first film up and I was the new kid on the block. But we made a good movie." Ford said of Scott in 2000: "I admire his work. We had a bad patch there, and I'm over it." In 2006 Ford reflected on the production of the film saying: "What I remember more than anything else when I see Blade Runner is not the 50 nights of shooting in the rain, but the voiceover ... I was still obliged to work for these clowns that came in writing one bad voiceover after another." Ridley Scott confirmed in the summer 2007 issue of Total Film that Harrison Ford contributed to the Blade Runner Special Edition DVD, and had already recorded his interviews. "Harrison's fully on board", said Scott.

The Bradbury Building in downtown Los Angeles served as a filming location, and a Warner Bros. backlot housed the LA 2019 streets. Other locations included the Ennis-Brown House and the 2nd Street Tunnel. Test screenings resulted in several changes including adding a voice-over, a happy ending and the removal of a Holden hospital scene. The relationship between the filmmakers and the investors was difficult, which culminated in Deeley and Scott being fired but still working on the film. Crew members created T-shirts during filming saying, "Yes Guv'nor, My Ass" that mocked Scott's unfavorable comparison of U.S. and British crews; Scott responded with a T-shirt of his own, "Xenophobia Sucks" making the incident known as the T-shirt war.

In June 2009, The New York Times reported that Scott and his brother, director Tony Scott, were working on a series of 5–10 minute shorts, Purefold, inspired by Blade Runner and aimed first at the web and then perhaps television. Due to rights problems, the series was not to be linked too closely to the characters or events of the 1982 film. On February 7, 2010, it was announced that production on Purefold had ceased, due to funding problems.

On March 3, 2011, it was reported that Alcon Entertainment, a production company financed by Warner Bros., was "in final discussions to secure film, television and ancillary franchise rights to produce prequels and sequels to the iconic 1982 science-fiction thriller Blade Runner." It was also reported that month that Christopher Nolan was desired as director.

On August 18, 2011, it was announced that Ridley Scott would direct and produce a new Blade Runner film, although work would not begin until at least 2013. Producer Andrew A. Kosove suggested that Harrison Ford, who had starred in the original film, was unlikely to be involved. Scott said that the film was "liable to be a sequel" but without the previous cast, and that he was close to finding a writer who "might be able to help [him] deliver". On February 6, 2012, Kosove stated: "It is absolutely, patently false that there has been any discussion about Harrison Ford being in Blade Runner. To be clear, what we are trying to do with Ridley now is go through the painstaking process of trying to break the back of the story ... The casting of the movie could not be further from our minds at this moment." When Scott was asked about the possibility of a sequel in October 2012, he said, "It's not a rumor—it's happening. With Harrison Ford? I don't know yet. Is he too old? Well, he was a Nexus-6 so we don't know how long he can live. And that's all I'm going to say at this stage."

Scott said in November 2014 that he would not direct the film and would instead produce; that filming would begin in late 2014 or 2015, and that Ford's character would only appear in "the third act" of the sequel. On February 26, 2015, the sequel was confirmed, with Denis Villeneuve as its director. Ford was confirmed to be returning as Deckard; so too Hampton Fancher, one of the two writers of the original film. The film was expected to enter production in mid-2016.

== Films ==
=== Blade Runner (1982) ===
Blade Runner, the first film in the franchise, is a 1982 neo-noir science fiction film, serving as a loose adaptation of Philip K. Dick's 1968 novel Do Androids Dream of Electric Sheep?. The film is set in a dystopian Los Angeles of 2019, in which genetically bioengineered replicants, which are visually indistinguishable from adult humans, are manufactured by the Tyrell Corporation to work on off-world colonies. Those that escape and return to Earth are hunted down and "retired" by special police operatives known as "blade runners". The story focuses on burnt-out expert blade runner Rick Deckard, who reluctantly agrees to take on one last assignment to hunt down a group of recently escaped replicants led by Roy Batty. During his investigations, Deckard meets Rachael, an advanced experimental replicant who causes him to question his attitude towards replicants and what it means to be human. Starring Harrison Ford, Rutger Hauer, Sean Young, and Edward James Olmos, it was released in the United States on June 25, 1982. It underperformed in North American theaters, but has since become a cult film. The year following its release, the film won the prestigious Hugo Award for Best Dramatic Presentation. Hailed for its production design, depicting a "retrofitted" future, it remains a leading example of neo-noir cinema. The film's soundtrack, composed by Vangelis, was critically acclaimed and nominated in 1983 for a BAFTA and Golden Globe as best original score. In 1993, the film was selected for preservation in the United States National Film Registry by the Library of Congress, being deemed "culturally, historically, or aesthetically significant". Blade Runner is now regarded by many critics as one of the all-time best science fiction films.

=== Blade Runner 2049 (2017) ===
On April 16, 2015, Ryan Gosling entered negotiations for a role in a Blade Runner sequel. Gosling confirmed his casting in November 2015, citing the involvement of Villeneuve and Deakins as factors for his decision. On May 20, Roger Deakins was hired as director of photography. Principal photography was set to begin in July, with Warner Bros. distributing the film domestically and Sony Pictures Entertainment handling international release. An official release date of January 12, 2018, was announced on February 18, 2016. When interviewed at the 2015 Toronto International Film Festival, Villeneuve disclosed that the plot would include the ambiguity of whether or not Deckard is a human or a replicant. On March 31, 2016, Robin Wright entered final negotiations for a role in the film, and on April 2, Dave Bautista posted a picture of himself with an origami unicorn, hinting at a role in the film. Bautista and Wright were confirmed to be joining the cast on April 4, and a filming start date of July was established. In late April 2016, the film's release date was moved up to October 6, 2017, as well as Ana de Armas and Sylvia Hoeks being added to the cast. Carla Juri was cast in May 2016. In June, Mackenzie Davis and Barkhad Abdi were cast, with David Dastmalchian, Hiam Abbass and Lennie James joining in July. Jared Leto was added to the cast in August. In March 2017, Edward James Olmos confirmed he was in the film in a sequence playing original character Gaff. In September 2015, Warner Bros. trademarked the name Blade Runner: Androids Dream, prompting speculation that this was the film's title; this was revealed to have been an early title of the film by in October 2017. However, after principal photography began in July 2016 and, as of September 2016, was filming in Budapest, Hungary, Warner Bros. announced the title of the film to be Blade Runner 2049 in October 2016. Shooting ended in November 2016 in Hungary, and the film was released on October 6, 2017.

=== Future ===
Over the years Ridley Scott has expressed interest in making additional films.

Writer of both films Hampton Fancher also revealed that he was considering reviving an old story idea involving Deckard travelling to another country, and Ford said that he would be open to returning if he liked the script. In January 2018, Scott stated that he had "another [story] ready to evolve and be developed, [that] there is certainly one to be done for sure", referring to a third Blade Runner film.

== Short films ==
On August 29, 2017, Denis Villeneuve, director of Blade Runner 2049, announced that he had organized for two filmmakers to direct several short films exploring incidents that occurred between the events of Blade Runner and Blade Runner 2049. These films were included as bonus features on most home video releases of Blade Runner 2049.

=== Blade Runner Black Out 2022 (2017) ===
On September 26, 2017, the first short film, Blade Runner Black Out 2022, was released on Crunchyroll. It is a prequel to 2036: Nexus Dawn and 2048: Nowhere to Run, directed by Shinichirō Watanabe and produced by CygamesPictures. The film is primarily set in 2022, following an EMP detonation that has caused a global blackout, which has had massive, destructive implications all over the world. During a preview of the film, Watanabe said that the original film was "definitely the movie that influenced me the most as an anime director". Edward James Olmos reprises his role as Gaff.

=== 2036: Nexus Dawn (2017) ===
The second short film released in the lead up to Blade Runner 2049, 2036: Nexus Dawn, is directed by Luke Scott, who had previously developed short films connecting the events of Ridley Scott films Prometheus and Alien: Covenant. The film stars Jared Leto as Niander Wallace and Benedict Wong as Lawmaker, following Wallace as he presents a new Nexus-9 replicant to the lawmakers in an attempt to have a prohibition on replicants lifted.

=== 2048: Nowhere to Run (2017) ===
The third and final short film, 2048: Nowhere to Run, also directed by Scott, follows Nexus-8 replicant Sapper Morton (Dave Bautista) as he protects a mother and daughter from thugs.

== Television ==
=== Blade Runner: Black Lotus (2021) ===
Blade Runner: Black Lotus is an animated series being produced for Adult Swim and Crunchyroll. It was announced on November 29, 2018, and was created in partnership with Alcon Television Group, part of Alcon Entertainment, the owners of the Blade Runner franchise. It has Shinichirō Watanabe as creative producer. Shinji Aramaki and Kenji Kamiyama directed the series, which has 13 episodes. It aired English dubbed on Adult Swim on its Toonami programming block and streamed by Crunchyroll. The series has been produced by Japanese animation studio Sola Digital Arts. It has premiered on November 14, 2021.

The series takes place in the year 2032 and includes "familiar" characters from the Blade Runner universe. The series is set ten years after the anime short Blade Runner Black Out 2022.

=== Blade Runner 2099 (2026) ===
In November 2021, Ridley Scott stated that a pilot for a Blade Runner television series and the show's bible had been written, with the project likely set to consist of ten hour-long episodes. In February 2022, the series was officially announced to be in development, with the title of Blade Runner 2099 and it was being developed for Amazon Prime Video. Silka Luisa has signed onto the project as writer, and executive producer. Ridley Scott, Andrew Kosove, Broderick Johnson, Michael Green, Ben Roberts, Cynthia Yorkin, David W. Zucker, and Clayton Krueger will serve as additional executive producers. Scott is in early negotiations to serve as director for the episodes. On September 15, 2022, Amazon ordered it as a miniseries. It is intended to be released via streaming as an Amazon Prime Video exclusive. The project is being developed as a joint-venture production between Scott Free Productions, Amazon Studios, and Alcon Entertainment. Canadian director Jeremy Podeswa will direct the pilot episode, and will also be an executive producer and a producing director for the series. In February 2024, Jonathan van Tulleken was reportedly tapped to direct the first two episodes, replacing Podeswa who had stepped down due to scheduling conflicts. Van Tulleken will also serve as an executive producer. Production, originally scheduled for summer 2023 in Belfast but postponed earlier that May due to the Writers Guild of America strike, has been relocated to Prague and began in April 2024. In May, Michelle Yeoh was cast in a lead role and in June, Hunter Schafer joined the cast. Blade Runner 2099 is scheduled to premiere on Amazon Prime Video on November 25, 2026.

== Cast and crew ==
=== Cast ===
This table shows the characters and the actors who have portrayed them throughout the franchise. A dark grey cell indicates the character was not in the production, or that the character's presence in the production has not yet been announced.

Characters	Films		Video games			Short films		
Characters	Blade Runner	Blade Runner 2049	Blade Runner	Blade Runner 2049: Memory Lab	Blade Runner: Revelations	2036: Nexus Dawn	2048: Nowhere to Run	Blade Runner Black Out 2022
Characters	1982	2017	1997	2017	2018	2017	2017	2017
Rick Deckard ID: B-263-54	Harrison Ford	Harrison Ford	Silent role					
Gaff	Edward James Olmos	Edward James Olmos	Victor Gardell		Kirk Thornton			Edward James Olmos
Rachael NEXUS-7 N7FAA52318	Sean Young	Sean Young	Sean Young					
Rachael NEXUS-7 N7FAA52318	Sean Young	Loren Peta (Note: Body-double.)	Sean Young					
Dr. Eldon Tyrell	Joe Turkel		Joe Turkel					
Leon Kowalski NEXUS-6 N6MAC41717	Brion James		Brion James					
Hannibal Chew	James Hong		James Hong					
J.F. Sebastian	William Sanderson		William Sanderson					
Howie Lee Sushi Master	Robert Okazaki		Toru Nagai					
Dave Holden	Morgan Paull				Steve Prince			
Harry Bryant	M. Emmet Walsh							
Zhora Salome NEXUS-6 N6FAB61216	Joanna Cassidy							
Abdul Ben Hassan	Ben Astar		Stephen Sorrentino					
Cambodian Fish Dealer	Kimiko Hiroshige		Karen Maruyama					
Bear	Kevin Thompson		Silent role					
Kaiser	John Edward Allen		Gary Colombo					
Lilith Tyrell	Uncredited actress				Carolyn Hennesy			
Niander Wallace		Jared Leto		Cory Todd		Jared Leto		
Sapper Morton NEXUS-8 N8PSD32974		Dave Bautista					Dave Bautista	Silent role
Officer "Joe" K NEXUS-9 KD6-3.7		Ryan Gosling						
Lt. Joshi		Robin Wright						
Coco		David Dastmalchian						
Nandez		Wood Harris						
Ray McCoy			Mark Benninghofen					
Crystal Steele			Lisa Edelstein					
Lt. Edison Guzza			Jeff Garlin					
Blade Runner lead NEXUS-9 NX96370.4				Nate Scholz				
Harper					Tyler Moore			
Roy Batty NEXUS-6 N6MAA10816	Rutger Hauer							
Pris Stratton NEXUS-6 N6FAB21416	Daryl Hannah							
Luv NEXUS-9		Sylvia Hoeks						
Mariette		Mackenzie Davis						
Freysa Sadeghpour NEXUS-8 DRV09817		Hiam Abbass						
Rachael Clone		Sean Young						
Rachael Clone		Loren Peta (body-double)						
Female replicant		Sallie Harmsen						
Clovis			Mark Rolston					
Zuben			Gerald Okamura					
Luther			Jason Cottle					
Lance			Jason Cottle					
Eve					Dina Meyer			
Nexus-9 replicant						Set Sjöstrand		
Iggy Cygnus NEXUS-8 BJ670228								Jovan Jackson
Trixie NEXUS-8 WDV71673								Luci Christian
Saleslady	Carolyn DeMirjian							
Joi		Ana de Armas						
Dr. Ana Stelline		Carla Juri						
Mister Cotton		Lennie James						
File Crerk		Tómas Lemarquis						
Doc Badger		Barkhad Abdi						
Lucy Devlin			Pauley Perrette					
Dektora			Signy Coleman					
Sadik			Alexander Mervin					
Gordo Frizz			Bruno Oliver					
Runciter			Warren Burton					
Izo			Timothy Dang					
Bullet Bob			Vincent Schiavelli					
Technician				Evanne Friedmann				
Phil				Dante Harper				
Holly					Valerie Harem			
Lawmaker						Benedict Wong		
Lawmaker #2						Ned Dennehy		
Lawmaker #3						Adé Sapara		
Lawmaker #4						Ania Marson		
Salt							Gerard Miller	
Mother							Orion Ben	
Ella							Gaia Ottman	
Spectator							Björn Freiberg	
Shop patron							Adam Savage	
Ren								Bryson Baugus

Note: A gray cell indicates character did not appear in that medium.

=== Crew ===
Role	Films		Short films		
Role	Blade Runner (1982)	Blade Runner 2049 (2017)	2036: Nexus Dawn (2017)	2048: Nowhere to Run (2017)	Blade Runner Black Out 2022 (2017)
Director(s)	Ridley Scott	Denis Villeneuve	Luke Scott	Luke Scott	Shinichirō Watanabe
Screenwriter(s)	David Peoples; Hampton Fancher	Michael Green; Hampton Fancher	Michael Green; Hampton Fancher	Michael Green; Hampton Fancher	Shinichirō Watanabe
Producer(s)	Michael Deeley	Bud Yorkin; Andrew A. Kosove; Broderick Johnson; Cynthia Sikes Yorkin			Joseph Chou; Shun Kashima; Nobuhiro Takenaka; Al-Francis Cuenca
Composer(s)	Vangelis	Hans Zimmer; Benjamin Wallfisch	Blitz//Berlin		Flying Lotus
Cinematography	Jordan Cronenweth	Roger Deakins			Shukou Murase
Editor(s)	Terry Rawlings; Marsha Nakashima	Joe Walker			Kiyoshi Hirose
Production companies	Shaw Brothers; The Ladd Company; Blade Runner Partnership	Torridon Films; Columbia Pictures; 16:14 Entertainment; Alcon Entertainment; Scott Free Productions; Thunderbird Entertainment	Columbia Pictures; Alcon Entertainment; Scott Free Productions; Thunderbird Entertainment		CygamesPictures; Alcon Entertainment
Distributor	Warner Bros.	Warner Bros. Sony Pictures	Warner Bros. Sony Pictures (via YouTube)	Warner Bros. Sony Pictures (via YouTube)	Warner Bros. (via Crunchyroll & YouTube)
U.S. release date	June 25, 1982	October 6, 2017	August 30, 2017	September 16, 2017	September 27, 2017
Duration	117 minutes	163 minutes	6 minutes	6 minutes	15 minutes

== Other media ==
=== Novels ===
==== Blade Runner: A Story of the Future ====
Philip K. Dick refused a $400,000 offer to write a Blade Runner novelization, saying: "[I was] told the cheapo novelization would have to appeal to the twelve-year-old audience" and it "would have probably been disastrous to me artistically". He added, "That insistence on my part of bringing out the original novel and not doing the novelization – they were just furious. They finally recognized that there was a legitimate reason for reissuing the novel, even though it cost them money. It was a victory not just of contractual obligations but of theoretical principles." Do Androids Dream of Electric Sheep? was eventually reprinted as a tie-in, with the film poster as a cover and the original title in parentheses below the Blade Runner title. Eventually, a novelization of the movie entitled Blade Runner: A Story of the Future, written by Les Martin, was released in 1982.

==== Blade Runner 2: The Edge of Human ====
In 1994, K. W. Jeter, a personal friend of Philip K. Dick, began developing a series of Blade Runner novels that would serve as a continuation of both the film Blade Runner, and the novel upon which it was based, Do Androids Dream of Electric Sheep?. The first of these novels, Blade Runner 2: The Edge of Human, was published on October 1, 1995. The novel was set several months after the events of Blade Runner, following Deckard living in an isolated shack outside of Los Angeles, with Rachael with him in a Tyrell transport container, intended to slow down the replicant aging process. Deckard is called in by the human template of Rachael, Sarah Tyrell, to hunt down a missing replicant in exchange for technology allowing Rachael to live. Meanwhile, Roy Batty, the human template for the replicant of the same name, hires Dave Holden, a blade runner previously attacked by Leon, to help him hunt down the man that he believes to be the sixth replicant – Deckard.

==== Blade Runner 3: Replicant Night ====
In 1996, K. W. Jeter published science fiction novel Blade Runner 3: Replicant Night, the sequel to Blade Runner 2: The Edge of Human. The novel follows Rick Deckard, now living on Mars, as he is acting as a consultant to a film crew filming the story of his days as a blade runner. He finds himself drawn into a mission on behalf of the replicants he was once assigned to kill. Meanwhile, the mystery surrounding the beginnings of the Tyrell Corporation is being dragged out into the light.

==== Blade Runner 4: Eye and Talon ====
Blade Runner 4: Eye and Talon, also known as Blade Runner 4: Beyond Orion, is the third novel written by K. W. Jeter that continues the storyline started in the 1982 Blade Runner film. The novel was published in 2000. The story takes place concurrently with the events of Blade Runner 3: Replicant Night, following Iris, a Blade Runner who has been sent on an assignment to find Eldon Tyrell's "real owl", which appears to have special significance to the Tyrell Corporation and other organizations.

=== Video games ===
Year	Title	Genre	Developer	Publisher	Platform(s)
1985	Blade Runner	Action	Andy Stodart, Ian Foster	CRL Group PLC	Commodore 64, ZX Spectrum, Amstrad CPC
1997	Blade Runner	Point-and-click	Westwood Studios	Virgin Interactive	Windows, Macintosh, Linux, ScummVM
2018	Blade Runner: Revelations	Virtual reality	Seismic Games	Alcon Entertainment	Google Daydream
TBA	Blade Runner 2033: Labyrinth	Adventure	Annapurna Games	Annapurna Interactive	Windows

There are four video games based on Blade Runner: one from 1985 for Commodore 64, ZX Spectrum, and Amstrad CPC by CRL Group PLC based on the music by Vangelis (due to licensing issues), another adventure PC game from 1997 by Westwood Studios, and a VR game from 2018 by Seismic Games. Both the 1997 and 2018 video games feature new characters and branching storylines based on the Blade Runner world. Eldon Tyrell, Gaff, Leon, Rachael, Chew, J. F. Sebastian and Howie Lee appear in the 1997 video game, their voice files are recorded by the original actors, with the exception of Gaff, who is replaced by Javier Grajeda (as Victor Gardell) and Howie Lee, who is replaced by Toru Nagai. The player assumes the role of McCoy, another replicant-hunter working at the same time as Deckard. Gaff and Dave Holden both appear in the 2018 game, voiced respectively by Kirk Thornton and Steve Prince, while Carolyn Hennesy voices Lilith Tyrell, niece of Eldon Tyrell; Lilith previously appeared in Blade Runner in photographic form, actress unaccredited.

The PC game and VR game feature a non-linear plot, non-player characters that each ran in their own independent AI, and an unusual pseudo-3D engine (which eschewed polygonal solids in favor of voxel elements) that did not require the use of a 3D accelerator card to play the game.

A tabletop role-playing game, Blade Runner: The Roleplaying Game, released in 2022.

=== Comics ===
==== A Marvel Comics Super Special: Blade Runner ====
Archie Goodwin scripted the comic book adaptation of Blade Runner, entitled A Marvel Comics Super Special: Blade Runner, published in September 1982 as the twenty-second issue of the Marvel Comics Super Special series of titles which, by the year 1982, only printed adaptations of films Marvel had obtained the rights to. It was later reprinted as a two-part miniseries, without the feature content contained in the special. In some printings, several pages of the comic were published out of order. Other printing set these pages in the correct order. In the UK it was reprinted as the Blade Runner Annual published by Grandreams. Again, the feature content of the original special was not reprinted. The trade paperback was published in black and white and contains images from the film; it is one of the rarest Marvel Comics trades ever.

The book was poorly received upon its initial release. It was ridiculed for what the critics perceived as bad writing and misquoted lines of dialogue from the film.

==== Do Androids Dream of Electric Sheep? ====
In 2009, BOOM! Studios published Do Androids Dream of Electric Sheep?, a 24 issue comic book limited series and direct adaptation of Philip K. Dick's novel by the same name. The series was drawn by Tony Parker, and was nominated for an Eisner Award in the category Best New Series. The characters in the adaptation were drawn in similar styles to the versions of the characters as presented in the original 1982 film.

==== Dust to Dust ====
In 2010, BOOM! Studios published Dust to Dust, an 8-issue comic book limited series serving as a prequel to the events of both Do Androids Dream of Electric Sheep? (1968), Blade Runner (1982) and Do Androids Dream of Electric Sheep? (2009). The series was written by Chris Roberson and drawn by Robert Adler, detailing the days after World War Terminus. The series was marketed with a sneak peek of an eight-page digital preview which was released on iPad, iPhone and iPod Touch.

==== Aahna Ashina Series ====
Three sequences of comics were released covering the life of LAPD detective Aahna Ashina, titled Blade Runner 2019, Blade Runner 2029 and Blade Runner 2039.

All three volumes were edited by David Leach, written by Mike Johnson (With Michael Green, the screenwriter for Bladerunner 2049 writing with Green for Blade Runner 2019, and Mellow Brown writing with Green on the first issues of Blade Runner 2039), drawn by Andres Guinaldo, colored by Marco Lesko and lettered by Jim Campbell.

===== Blade Runner 2019 =====
On October 4, 2018, The Hollywood Reporter published an announcement about a new Blade Runner comic series that would be set in the film universe. The comic was co-written by Michael Green (who had worked on the second film) together with Mike Johnson, who scripted the comic. The first issue was released on July 17, 2019, with the twelfth and final issue released on November 18, 2020. The comic was collected into three volumes, with the first released on November 20, 2019, and the last on February 24, 2021.

===== Blade Runner 2029 =====
On December 16, 2020, a sequel to Blade Runner 2019 was released, continuing the 2019 series of comics. Titan Comics again were publishing.

===== Blade Runner 2039 =====
On December 7, 2022, Blade Runner 2039 was released by Titan Comics. Written by Mike Johnson, it is set ten years after Blade Runner 2029 and completed the Aahna Ashina series.

==== Blade Runner Origins ====
On March 10, 2021, Blade Runner Origins was released by Titan Comics. Written by Mike Johnson, K. Perkins, and Mellow Brown, it is set in 2009, ten years before Blade Runner.

In June 2024, editor David Leach indicated that there would be a second set of comics ("Blade Runner Origins: Cascade Year 2"), but no date has been set for this as of October 2024.

==== Blade Runner: Black Lotus ====
On April 28, 2022, Blade Runner: Black Lotus was released by Titan Comics. Written by Nancy Collins, it is set after the events of the Blade Runner: Black Lotus animated series.

In common with most of the Blade Runner comics, each arc/volume has 4 issues.

The first arc Leaving L.A. ran from August 10, 2022 to November 2, 2022; a collected book was released in February 2023.

In February 2024, the editor, David Leach, confirmed on Twitter that a second volume would be released in 2025.

The second arc Las Vegas ran from September 17, 2025 to March 4, 2026; a collected book was released in August 2026. The final frame in the final issue of the second arc has the caption "THE END. Black Lotus will return", but no announcements about a third volume has been made as of November 2026.

==== Blade Runner: Tokyo Nexus ====
On July 31, 2024, Blade Runner: Tokyo Nexus was released by Titan Comics. Written by Kianna Shore and Mellow Brown, it is set in 2015, four years before Blade Runner and six years after Blade Runner Origins.

In common with most of the Blade Runner comics, each arc/volume has 4 issues.

The first arc Die in Peace ran from July 31, 2024 to October 23, 2024; a collected book was released in February 2025.

The second arc To Lose is to Win ran from May 6, 2026 to August 12, 2026; a collected book is expected in December 2026.

The third arc Die with Honor began its run on November 4, 2026.

=== Nonfiction books ===
Future Noir: The Making of Blade Runner

Before filming of Blade Runner began, Cinefantastique magazine commissioned Paul M. Sammon to write an article about Blade Runner's production. This article became the book Future Noir: The Making of Blade Runner. The book chronicles Blade Runner's evolution, focusing on film-set politics, especially the British director's experiences with his first American film crew; of which producer Alan Ladd, Jr. has said, "Harrison wouldn't speak to Ridley and Ridley wouldn't speak to Harrison. By the end of the shoot Ford was 'ready to kill Ridley', said one colleague. He really would have taken him on if he hadn't been talked out of it." Future Noir has short cast biographies and quotations about their experiences, and photographs of the film's production and preliminary sketches. A second edition of Future Noir was published in 2007. To promote the then-upcoming Blade Runner 2049, Future Noir Revised & Updated Edition: The Making of Blade Runner was re-released on September 13, 2017.

The Art and Soul of Blade Runner 2049

A behind-the-scenes guide to the film by Tanya Lapointe.

Additional books

- Blade Runner: The Inside Story by Don Shay.

==== Academia ====
- BFI Modern Classics: Blade Runner by Scott Bukatman.
- York Film Notes: Blade Runner by Nick Lacey.
- Retrofitting Blade Runner: Issues in Ridley Scott's Blade Runner by Judith B. Kerman.
- The Cyberpunk Nexus: Exploring the Blade Runner Universe, edited by Lou Tambone and Joe Bongiorno.
- Blade Runner: Cultographies by Matt Hills
- The Blade Runner Experience: The Legacy of a Science-Fiction Classic, edited by Will Brooker.
- Film Architecture: Set Designs From Metropolis to Blade Runner by Dietrich Neumann.

==== Autobiographies ====
- All Those Moments: Stories of Heroes, Villains, Replicants, and Blade Runners by Rutger Hauer.
- Blade Runners, Deer Hunters, and Blowing the Bloody Doors Off: My Life in Cult Movies by Michael Deeley, co-written with Matthew Field.

=== Documentaries ===
The film has been the subject of a number of documentaries.

Blade Runner: Convention Reel (1982, 13 minutes)
Co-directed by Muffet Kaufman and Jeffrey B. Walker. Shot and screen in 16mm, featured no narrator, was filmed in 1981 while Blade Runner was still in production and featured short "behind-the-scenes" segments showing sets being built and sequences being shot, as well as interviews with Ridley Scott, Syd Mead and Douglas Trumbull. Appears on the Blade Runner Ultimate Collector's Edition.

On the Edge of Blade Runner (2000, 55 minutes)
Directed by Andrew Abbott and hosted/written by Mark Kermode. Interviews with production staff, including Ridley Scott, give details of the creative process and the turmoil during preproduction. Insights into Philip K. Dick and the origins of Do Androids Dream of Electric Sheep? are provided by Paul M. Sammon and Hampton Fancher.

Future Shocks (2003, 27 minutes)
A documentary by TVOntario. It includes interviews with executive producer Bud Yorkin, Syd Mead, and the cast, and commentary by science fiction author Robert J. Sawyer and from film critics.

Dangerous Days: Making Blade Runner (2007, 213 minutes)
A documentary directed and produced by Charles de Lauzirika for The Final Cut version of the film. Its source material comprises more than 80 interviews, including extensive conversations with Ford, Young, and Scott. The documentary is presented in eight chapters, with each of the first seven covering a portion of the filmmaking process. The final chapter examines Blade Runner's controversial legacy.

All Our Variant Futures: From Workprint to Final Cut (2007, 29 minutes)
Produced by Paul Prischman, appears on the Blade Runner Ultimate Collector's Edition and provides an overview of the film's multiple versions and their origins, as well as detailing the seven-year-long restoration, enhancement and remastering process behind The Final Cut.

=== Cancelled projects ===
==== Metropolis ====
In the 2000s, Scott proposed a sequel to Blade Runner, entitled Metropolis. The project never came to fruition due to rights issues.

==== Purefold ====
In June 2009, The New York Times reported that Scott and his brother, director Tony Scott, were working on a series of 5–10 minute shorts, Purefold, inspired by Blade Runner and aimed first at the web and then perhaps television. Due to rights problems, the series was not to be linked too closely to the characters or events of the 1982 film. On February 7, 2010, it was announced that production on Purefold had ceased, due to funding problems.

== Music ==
=== Soundtracks ===
The Blade Runner soundtrack by Vangelis is a dark melodic combination of classic composition and futuristic synthesizers which mirrors the film-noir retro-future envisioned by Ridley Scott. Vangelis, fresh from his Academy Award-winning score for Chariots of Fire, composed and performed the music on his synthesizers. He also made use of various chimes and the vocals of collaborator Demis Roussos. Another memorable sound is the haunting tenor sax solo "Love Theme" by British saxophonist Dick Morrissey, who performed on many of Vangelis's albums. Ridley Scott also used "Memories of Green" from the Vangelis album See You Later, an orchestral version of which Scott would later use in his film Someone to Watch Over Me.

Along with Vangelis' compositions and ambient textures, the film's soundscape also features a track by the Japanese ensemble Nipponia – "Ogi No Mato" or "The Folding Fan as a Target" from the Nonesuch Records release Traditional Vocal and Instrumental Music – and a track by harpist Gail Laughton from "Harps of the Ancient Temples" on Laurel Records.

Despite being well received by fans and critically acclaimed and nominated in 1983 for a BAFTA and Golden Globe for Best Original Score, and the promise of a soundtrack album from Polydor Records in the end titles of the film, the release of the official soundtrack recording was delayed for over a decade. There are two official releases of the music from Blade Runner. In light of the lack of a release of an album, the New American Orchestra recorded an orchestral adaptation in 1982 which bore little resemblance to the original. Some of the film tracks would, in 1989, surface on the compilation Vangelis: Themes, but not until the 1992 release of the Director's Cut version would a substantial amount of the film's score see commercial release.

These delays and poor reproductions led to the production of many bootleg recordings over the years. A bootleg tape surfaced in 1982 at science fiction conventions and became popular given the delay of an official release of the original recordings, and in 1993, Off World Music, Ltd created a bootleg CD that would prove more comprehensive than Vangelis' official CD in 1994. A set with three CDs of Blade Runner-related Vangelis music was released in 2007. Titled Blade Runner Trilogy, the first disc contains the same tracks as the 1994 official soundtrack release, the second features previously unreleased music from the film, and the third disc is all newly composed music from Vangelis, inspired by, and in the spirit of the film.

Jóhann Jóhannsson, who had worked with Villeneuve on Prisoners, Sicario, and Arrival, was initially announced as composer for Blade Runner 2049. However, Villeneuve and Jóhannsson decided to end the collaboration because Villeneuve felt the film "needed something different, and I needed to go back to something closer to Vangelis's soundtrack". New composers Hans Zimmer and Benjamin Wallfisch joined in July 2017. In September, Jóhannsson's agent confirmed that he was no longer involved and that he was contractually forbidden from commenting on the situation.

According to Epic Records, Zimmer and Wallfisch sought to continue the legacy of the original Blade Runner score by incorporating the Yamaha CS-80 synthesizer. Zimmer has said of the soundtrack: "First of all, I realized that Denis [Villeneuve] is a director who has a vision; he has a voice. Remember, I've done a lot of movies with Ridley Scott. So, it was important that this was an autonomous piece of work. Let's just be honest. Ridley is a hard act to follow—as is Vangelis. While Ben [Wallfisch] was four-years-old, I had actually experienced all of this. We watched and literally, as we stopped watching, we decided on the palette. We decided this wasn't going to be an orchestral thing. The story spoke to us."

The Blade Runner 2049 soundtrack was released on October 5, 2017, and was nominated for the BAFTA Award for Best Film Music at the 71st British Academy Film Awards.

== Reception ==
=== Box office performance ===
Film	Release date	Box office gross			Box office ranking		Budget	Reference
Film	Release date	North America	Other territories	Worldwide	All time US and Canada	All time worldwide	Budget	Reference
Blade Runner	June 25, 1982	$32,868,943	—N/a	$32,868,943	2,517	—N/a	$28 million	
Blade Runner 2049	October 6, 2017	$92,071,675	$175,399,033	$267,570,708	806	564	$150 million	
Total		$124,254,197	$167,185,499	$292,108,601			$178 million	

=== Critical and public response ===
Film	Rotten Tomatoes	Metacritic	CinemaScore
Blade Runner	89% (8.50/10 average rating) (126 reviews)	84 (15 reviews)	—N/a
Blade Runner 2049	88% (8.30/10 average rating) (444 reviews)	81 (54 reviews)	A−

=== Cultural impact ===
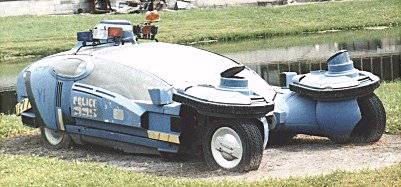
An image of a spinner (police variant) on display at Disney-MGM Studios

While not initially a success with North American audiences, the film was popular internationally and garnered a cult following. The film's dark style and futuristic designs have served as a benchmark and its influence can be seen in many subsequent science fiction films, video games, anime, and television programs. For example, Ronald D. Moore and David Eick, the producers of the re-imagining of Battlestar Galactica, have both cited Blade Runner as one of the major influences for the show. Blade Runner continues to reflect modern trends and concerns, and an increasing number consider it one of the greatest science fiction films of all time. It was voted the best science fiction film ever made in a poll of 60 eminent world scientists conducted in 2004. Blade Runner is also cited as an important influence to both the style and story of the Ghost in the Shell film series, which itself has been highly influential to the future-noir genre.

Blade Runner has been very influential to the cyberpunk movement. It also influenced the cyberpunk derivative biopunk that revolves around biotechnology and genetic engineering.

The film was selected for preservation in the United States National Film Registry in 1993 and is used in university courses. In 2007 it was named the second-most visually influential film of all time by the Visual Effects Society.

Blade Runner is one of the most musically sampled films of the 20th century. The 2009 album, I, Human, by Singaporean band Deus Ex Machina makes numerous references to the genetic engineering and cloning themes from the film, and even features a track titled "Replicant".

Blade Runner has influenced adventure games such as the 2012 graphical text adventure Cypher, Rise of the Dragon, Snatcher, the Tex Murphy series, Beneath a Steel Sky, Flashback: The Quest for Identity, Bubblegum Crisis (and its original anime films), the role-playing game Shadowrun, the first-person shooter Perfect Dark, and the Syndicate series of video games. The film is also cited as a major influence on Warren Spector, designer of the computer-game Deus Ex, which displays evidence of the film's influence in both its visual rendering and plot. The look of the film, darkness, neon lights and opacity of vision, is easier to render than complicated backdrops, making it a popular choice for game designers.

Blade Runner has also been the subject of parody, such as the comics Blade Bummer by Crazy comics, Bad Rubber by Steve Gallacci, and the Red Dwarf 2009 three-part miniseries, "Back to Earth".

Among the folklore that has developed around the film over the years has been the belief that the film was a curse to the companies whose logos were displayed prominently as product placements in some scenes. While they were market leaders at the time, Atari, Bell, Cuisinart and Pan Am experienced setbacks after the film's release. The Coca-Cola Company suffered losses during its failed introduction of New Coke in 1985, but soon afterwards regained its market share.

Oscar Pistorius, the double-amputee who dazzled the world by running in the 2012 Olympics on blade-like prosthetic legs, was given the nickname "Blade Runner" by the media for "literally running on blades", leading him to later title his autobiography Blade Runner: My Story.

Media recognitions for Blade Runner include:

Year	Presenter	Title	Rank	Notes
2001	The Village Voice	100 Best Films of the 20th Century	94	
2002	Online Film Critics Society (OFCS)	Top 100 Sci-fi Films of the Past 100 Years	2	
2002	Sight & Sound	Sight & Sound Top Ten Poll 2002	45	
2002	50 Klassiker, Film		None	
2003	1001 Movies You Must See Before You Die		None	
2003	Entertainment Weekly	The Top 50 Cult Movies	9	
2004	The Guardian, scientists	Top 10 Sci-fi Films of All Time	1	
2005	Total Film's editors	100 Greatest Movies of All Time	47	
2005	Time's critics	"All-Time" 100 Best Movies	None	
2008	New Scientist	All-time favorite science fiction film (readers and staff)	1	
2008	Empire	The 500 Greatest Movies of All Time	20	
2010	IGN	Top 25 Sci-Fi Movies of All Time	1	
2010	Total Film	100 Greatest Movies of All Time	None	
2012	Sight & Sound	Sight & Sound 2012 critics top 250 films	69	
2012	Sight & Sound	Sight & Sound 2012 directors top 100 films	67	
2014	Empire	The 301 Greatest Movies of All Time	11	
2018	IGN	The 25 Best Sci Fi Movies	2	

== Unofficially related media ==
=== Soldier (1998) ===
Soldier is a 1998 American science fiction action film directed by Paul W. S. Anderson and written by David Peoples (credited as David Webb Peoples). The film tells the story of a highly skilled genetically-advanced soldier defying his commanders and facing a relentless and brutal rival soldier. In the DVD commentary of Soldier, Peoples revealed that he had written the film's script in 1982, during production of Blade Runner. In 1998, while promoting Soldier (then recently released), Peoples then revealed that he had written Soldier as a "spin-off sidequel-spiritual successor" to Blade Runner, seeing both films as existing in the same fictional universe. The film obliquely refers to various elements of stories written by Philip K. Dick, and film adaptations thereof. Connections to Blade Runner in the film are as follows:

- A Spinner from Blade Runner can be seen in the wreckage on a junk planet in the film.
- One of the battles Kurt Russell's "Todd" character fought in, according to his battle records tattooed on his arm was "The Battle of Tannhäuser Gate", which Rutger Hauer's Roy Batty had mentioned having also fought in Blade Runner.
- An implication in the film is that the genetically-engineered soldiers meant to replace Todd and his fellow soldiers are in fact replicants, continuing a theme from Blade Runner. The 2017 short film 2036: Nexus Dawn implies that Nexus-9 replicants were developed around 2036. Soldier takes place in 2036.
- Incidentally, "The Battle of Tannhäuser Gate" is shown onscreen in one of the film's deleted scenes.

=== Total Recall 2070 (1999) ===
The television series Total Recall 2070 was initially planned as a spin-off of the film Total Recall, and would eventually be transformed into a hybrid of Total Recall and Blade Runner. The Total Recall film was also based on a Philip K. Dick story, "We Can Remember It for You Wholesale"; many similarities between Total Recall 2070 and Blade Runner were noted, as well as apparent inspiration from Isaac Asimov's The Caves of Steel and the TV series Holmes & Yoyo.

=== Alien franchise ===
Debates by the movie press and science fiction communities have suggested the Blade Runner and Alien films (at least those in which Ridley Scott is involved) may share a joint universe. Recent franchise installments (Prometheus and Alien: Covenant) lean heavily toward the themes of artificial intelligence and humanoid robots as opposed to 'creature features'. The tone of Alien: Covenant in particular has been noted as having a much more Blade Runner than Alien feel to it. A joint universe has not been publicly endorsed by Ridley Scott though he has indicated future Alien films will lean further towards the use of A.I. In both Alien and Blade Runner films are also multiple references and hidden clues referencing each other.

=== Fan films ===
==== What Might Have Been: Snake Dance (2012) ====
On December 12, 2012, in celebration of the 30th anniversary of the release of Blade Runner, Joanna Cassidy, who portrayed the replicant Zhora Salome in the film, released a short film on her YouTube channel entitled What Might Have Been: Snake Dance. Directed by Tamela D'Amico, based on an unfilmed scene from Blade Runner written by Hampton Fancher and David Peoples, with Cassidy reprising her role as Zhora, the film depicts the replicant performing the "snake dance", a dance Salome was stated to do for a living in Blade Runner. The song "Touched a Dream" by R. Kelly plays over the course of the film. The film, set shortly before the events of the original 1982 film, originated from Cassidy's infrequent unsuccessful requests to have the "snake dance" scene mentioned in Blade Runner filmed for Blade Runner: The Final Cut; despite this, Cassidy was successful in having Zhora's death scene refilmed, as a stunt double had filmed the scene in the theatrical version of the film.

==== Blade Runner – The Aquarelle Edition (2013) ====
Blade Runner – The Aquarelle Edition is a 2013 film reinterpretation of Blade Runner (1982). Running 35 minutes, the film follows the general storyline of the original film while taking certain liberties, with the film creator, Anders Ramsell referring to the film as a "paraphrase" of the original Blade Runner. The animated film, developed over the course of one and a half years, consists of 12,597 handmade aquarelle paintings. Archival audio from various characters from Blade Runner is reused during the film. Critic Mike Krumboltz observed of the film: the "result is like a Monet painting come to dystopian life".

==== Tears in the Rain (2017) ====
Tears in the Rain is a 2017 short film set in the fictional universe established by Blade Runner (1982), set before the events of the film. Written and directed by Christopher Grant Harvey on a budget of $1,500, Tears in the Rain follows John Kampff (Sean Cameron Michael), the future inventor of the Voight-Kampff machine, as he heads up the Tyrell Retirement Division. Following the recent rebellion of Nexus-3 replicants off-world, Kampff confronts Nexus-3 Andy Smith (Russel Savadier) a replicant janitor unaware of his true nature, as his body is about to shut down. Eleven minutes and eleven seconds in length, the film has won multiple awards.

==== Slice of Life (2019) ====
Slice of Life is a short film set in the fictional universe established by Blade Runner (1982), set in 2019, the same year as the events of Blade Runner. The film was developed over the course of three years, directed by Luka Hrgović and written by Anton Svetić. All special effects in Slice of Life are made using miniatures, back projections, matte paintings and practical effects. The film is approximately 25 minutes long. Although described as a fan movie, Slice of Life does not include Rick Deckard. It is simply an homage, using the same universe and telling its own original story with original characters. The film follows "low-life drug dealer who tries to turn his life around, but finds himself at the mercy of fate when he encounters a cop with an agenda of his own".

=== Internet Memes ===
Due to its dystopian themes, elements and scenes from the franchise have been used on social media platforms as Internet Memes.

Starting 2020, a scene from 2017 film Blade Runner 2049 in which the protagonist K (Ryan Gosling), silently watches a giant holographic advertisement after having been badly injured became an Internet Meme expressing sadness and despair. The scene circulated as an exploitable, with K and Joi usually replaced with other characters.

== See also ==
- List of adaptations of works by Philip K. Dick
