= Postmodern Metanarratives: Blade Runner and Literature in the Age of Image =

Postmodern Metanarratives: Blade Runner and Literature in the Age of Image is a non-fiction book by Décio Torres Cruz published in 2014 by Palgrave Macmillan.

== Synopsis ==
Postmodern Metanarratives investigates the connection between literature and cinema through a thorough study of Ridley Scott's cyberpunk filmic narrative Blade Runner. The book establishes a link between the literary tradition and the (post)modern in a collage of several texts that directly or indirectly are referenced in the film. The author compares the modern hero to the epic hero through the biblical epic works of Dante, John Milton and William Blake. The film's references to Sophocles's play Oedipus Rex and E. A. T. Hoffmann's story "The Sandman" are analyzed from a psychoanalytical perspective. The book explores the postmodern references in the film by examining their connections to the works of Philip K. Dick, William Burroughs, Alan Nourse and Aldous Huxley and to the literary sequels for Scott's film in K. W. Jeter's novels Blade Runner 2: The Edge of Human, Blade Runner 3: Replicant Night, Blade Runner 4: Eye and Talon. The author also discusses how the film Blade Runner reflects the ubiquitous power of media in postmodern society and deconstructs dualities such as fake/real and original/copy.

== Academic reception ==
Since its release, Postmodern Metanarratives has been included in undergraduate and graduate course lists. It has been cited in books, papers and scientific articles in academic journals,

The book review in chapter XVII: American Literature: The Twentieth Century of The Year's Work in English Studies by James Gifford and others states that this book

provides an extended examination of the film Blade Runner in the context of theories of postmodernism, especially the subgenre of cyberpunk and Charles Jencks's understanding of metanarrative: 'a narrative that talks about the process of its own making’ and 'inquires about its constituent nature’ and its appropriation of and 'similitude with' other narrative forms 'in the pursuit of change' (pp. 36–7). For literary scholars of the post-1945 period, Cruz's engagement with the contemporary fictional texts upon which the movie draws may be of most interest. For example, in chapter 6, 'Collating the Postmodern', Cruz explores the influence of Burroughs’s Blade Runner, a Movie, Alan Nourse’s novel The Bladerunner, and Philip K. Dick’s Do Androids Dream of Electric Sheep?, while charting thematic differences and similarities between literary precursors and the film.

== Contents ==
Besides the introduction and the conclusion, the book comprises 12 chapters:

1. On Words and Meanings: Contradictions of the Modern or Postmodern Contradictions?
2. Literature and Film: A Brief Overview of Theory and Criticism
3. Blurring Genres: Dissolving Literature and Film in Blade Runner
4. Revisiting the Biblical Tradition: Dante, Blake and Milton in Blade Runner
5. Revisiting the Psychoanalytical Tradition
6. Collating the Postmodern
7. When Differences Fall Apart
8. From Conception to Inception: A Never-Ending Story
9. Deleted and Alternate Scenes in BR
10. The Workprint
11. Postmodern Renaissance: The Final Cut and the Rebirth of a Classic 25 Years Later
12. Recycling Media: Blade Runner to Be Continued

The conclusion is entitled "Replicating Life and Art" and may be considered an extra final chapter. Besides revising the topics previously discussed, the conclusion also discusses some aspects of the American culture and establishes connections with other science-fiction novels, such as Ray Bradbury's Fahrenheit 451 and Aldous Huxley's Brave New World.
