= Themes in Blade Runner =

From the 1982 science fiction film

Despite the initial appearance and marketing of an action film, Blade Runner operates on an unusually rich number of dramatic levels. As with much of the cyberpunk genre, it owes a large debt to film noir, containing and exploring such conventions as the femme fatale, a Chandleresque first-person narration in the Theatrical Version, the questionable moral outlook of the hero—extended here to include even the literal humanity of the hero, as well as the usual dark and shadowy cinematography.

Eye reflecting the "Hades" landscape.

== Overview ==
It has been argued that Blade Runner thematically enfolds moral philosophy and philosophy of mind implications of the increasing human mastery of genetic engineering, within the context of classical Greek drama and its notions of hubris—and linguistically, drawing on the poetry of William Blake and the Bible. This is a theme subtly reiterated by the chess game between J. F. Sebastian and Tyrell based on the famous Immortal Game of 1851 symbolizing the struggle against mortality imposed by God. The Blade Runner FAQ offers further interpretation of the chess game, saying that it "represents the struggle of the replicants against the humans: the humans consider the replicants pawns, to be removed one by one. The individual replicants (pawns) are attempting to become immortal (a queen). At another level, the game between Tyrell and Sebastian represents Batty stalking Tyrell. Tyrell makes a fatal mistake in the chess game, and another fatal mistake trying to reason with Batty."

The film delves into the future implications of technology on the environment and society by reaching into the past using literature, religious symbolism, classical dramatic themes and film noir. This tension between past, present and future is apparent in the retrofitted future of Blade Runner, which is high-tech and gleaming in places but elsewhere decayed and old.

A high level of paranoia is present throughout the film with the visual manifestation of corporate power, omnipresent police, probing lights; and in the power over the individual represented particularly by genetic programming of the replicants. Control over the environment is seen on a large scale but also with how animals are created as mere commodities. This oppressive backdrop clarifies why many people are going to the off-world colonies, which clearly parallels the migration to the Americas. The popular 1980s prediction of the United States being economically surpassed by Japan is reflected in the domination of Japanese culture and corporations in the advertising of LA 2019. The film also makes extensive use of eyes and manipulated images to call into question reality and our ability to perceive it.

This provides an atmosphere of uncertainty for Blade Runner's central theme of examining humanity. In order to discover replicants, a psychological test is used with a number of questions intended to provoke emotion; making it the essential indicator of someone's "humanity". The replicants are juxtaposed with human characters who are unempathetic, and while the replicants show passion and concern for one another, the mass of humanity on the streets is cold and impersonal. The film goes so far as to put in doubt the nature of Rick Deckard and forces the audience to reevaluate what it means to be human.

== Genetic engineering and cloning ==
A Voight-Kampff machine is a fictional device to detect a replicant by measuring the minute emotional responses to questions designed to provoke an emotional response, including pupil dilation and pheromones.

=== Personhood ===
Blade Runner raises the question of whether a constructed being should count as a person. In the movie, replicants lack legal rights and are not regarded as human. Similar questions are raised in later unrelated works such as Her and Westworld. Some viewers speculate that the name "Deckard" may be a deliberate reference, by Philip K. Dick, to philosopher René Descartes; in any case, one of the replicants in the film, arguing for her own personhood, uses Descartes's famous quote, "I think therefore I am". While there is no scientific universal test for consciousness in the real world, the replicants' organic nature may make it difficult to reject the notion of their personhood. Artificial intelligence researcher Marcus Hutter asked in 2015, "How do I know that you (a fellow human) have feelings? I have no way of really knowing that. I just assume that because you are built up similarly to me and I know that I have emotions." Hutter argues that replicants are "built up similarly" to humans, and might therefore be more likely to be labeled as conscious than an inorganic intelligence would.

=== Eyes ===
Eye symbolism appears repeatedly in Blade Runner and provides insight into themes and characters therein. The film opens with an extreme closeup of an eye which fills the screen reflecting the industrial landscape seen below.

In Roy's quest to "meet his maker" he seeks out Chew, a genetic designer of eyes, who created the eyes of the Nexus-6. When told this, Roy quips, "Chew, if only you could see what I've seen with your eyes", ironic in that Roy's eyes are Chew's eyes since he created them, but it also emphasizes the importance of personal experience in the formation of self. Roy and Leon then intimidate Chew with disembodied eyes and he tells them about J. F. Sebastian.

It is symbolic that the man who designed replicant eyes shows the replicants the way to Tyrell. Eyes are widely regarded as "windows to the soul", eye contact being a facet of body language that unconsciously demonstrates intent and emotion and this is used to great effect in Blade Runner. The Voight-Kampff test that determines if you are human measures the emotions, specifically empathy through various biological responses such as fluctuation of the pupil and involuntary dilation of the iris. Tyrell's trifocal glasses are a reflection of his reliance on technology for his power and his myopic vision. Roy eye gouges Tyrell with his thumbs while killing him, a deeply intimate and brutal death that indicates judgement of Tyrell's soul.

In certain scenes, the pupils of replicants' eyes glow, which is evidence that Deckard may be a replicant himself.

In some scenes, the glow in the pupils of replicants' eyes creates a sense of artificiality. This effect was produced by cinematographer Jordan Cronenweth shining a light along the optical axis of the camera. According to Ridley Scott, "that kickback you saw from the replicants' retinas was a bit of a design flaw. I was also trying to say that the eye is really the most important organ in the human body. It's like a two-way mirror; the eye doesn't only see a lot, the eye gives away a lot. A glowing human retina seemed one way of stating that". Scott considers the glow to be a stylistic device (non-diegetic); only visible to the viewers to help them understand that they are viewing a replicant, almost always occurring after the characters have assumed as much.

The relationship between sight and memories is referenced several times in Blade Runner. Rachael's visual recollection of her memories, Leon's "precious photos", Roy's discussion with Chew and soliloquy at the end, "I've seen things you people wouldn't believe". However, just as prevalent is the concept that what the eyes see and the resulting memories are not to be trusted. This is a notion emphasized by Rachael's fabricated memories, Deckard's need to confirm a replicant based on more than appearance, and even the printout of Leon's photograph not matching the reality of the Esper visual.

Also in the Director's Cut, when at the Tyrell corporation the owl's eye pupils glow with a red tint. This was derived from Do Androids Dream of Electric Sheep?, in which real animals are rare and owls are very rare, since they were the first animals to start dying of the pollution which pushed humans Off-World. The red tint indicates that the owl is a replicant.

== Religious and philosophical symbolism ==
There is a subtext of Christian allegory in Blade Runner, particularly in regard to the Roy Batty character. Given the replicants' superhuman abilities, their identity as created beings (by Tyrell) and "fall from the heavens" (off-world) makes them analogous to fallen angels. In this context, Roy Batty shares similarities with Lucifer as he prefers to "reign in hell" (Earth) rather than "serve in heaven". This connection is also apparent when Roy deliberately misquotes William Blake, "Fiery the angels fell ..." (Blake wrote "Fiery the angels rose ..." in America a Prophecy). Nearing the end of his life, Roy creates a stigmata by driving a nail into his hand, and becomes a Christ-like figure by sacrificing himself for Deckard. Upon his death a dove appears to symbolise Roy's soul ascending into the heavens.

Zhora's gunshot wounds are both on her shoulder blades. The result makes her look like an angel whose wings have been cut off. Zhora uses serpent that "once corrupted man" in her performance.

A Nietzschean interpretation has also been argued for the film on several occasions. This is especially true for the Batty character, arguably a biased prototype for Nietzsche's Übermensch—not only due to his intrinsic characteristics, but also because of the outlook and demeanor he displays in many significant moments of the film. For instance:

A modern audience might admire Batty’s will to flee the confinements of slavery and perhaps sympathize with his existential struggle to live. Initially, however, his desire to live is subsumed by his desire for power to extend his life. Why? In Heidegger’s view, because death inevitably limits the number of choices we have, freedom is earned by properly concentrating on death. Thoughts of mortality give us a motive for taking life seriously. Batty’s status as a slave identifies him as an object, but his will to power casts him as an agent and subject in the Nietzschean sense. His physical and psychological courage to rebel is developed as an ethical principle in which he revolts against a social order that has conspired against him at the genetic, cultural, and political levels. In Heidegger’s view, Batty’s willingness to defy social conformity allows for him to authentically pursue the meaning of his existence beyond his programming as a soldier. Confronting his makers becomes part of his quest, but killing them marks his failure to transcend his own nature.

== Environment and globalization ==
Orson Scott Card wrote of the film, "It takes place in Los Angeles. No aliens at all. But it isn't the L.A. we know ... things have changed. Lots of things, moving through the background of the film, give us a powerful sense of being in a strange new place". The film depicts a world post ecocide, where warfare and capitalism have led to destruction of 'normal' ecological systems. The climate of the city in A.D. 2019 is very different from today's. It is strongly implied that industrial pollution has adversely affected planet Earth's environment, i.e. global warming and global dimming. Real animals are rare in the Blade Runner world. In Philip K. Dick's 1968 novel, Do Androids Dream of Electric Sheep?, animal extinction and human depopulation of the planet were consequent to the radioactive fallout of a nuclear war; owls were the first species to become extinct. This ties in with Deckard's comment about Dr. Tyrell's artificial owl: "It must be expensive." (cf. post-apocalyptic science fiction)

Given the many Asian peoples populating Los Angeles in A.D. 2019, and the cityspeak dialect policeman Gaff speaks to the Blade Runner, Rick Deckard, clearly indicates that much cultural mixing has happened. Globalization also is reflected in the name of the Shimata-Domínguez Corporation, whose slogan proclaims: "Helping America into the New World". This indicates that a mass migration is occurring, as there is a status quo that people want to escape.

The cultural and religious mixing can also be verified at the scene where Deckard chases Zhora. In the streets, we can see people dressed traditionally as Jews, hare krishnas, as well as young boys dressed as punks.

== Racism and slavery ==
Racism and slavery are concepts explored in Blade Runner, primarily through the replicants. Several correlations between treatment of the replicants and the historical treatment of Black people in America have been pointed out by theorists.

Replicants are explicitly compared to slaves, Roy Batty stating "Quite an experience to live in fear, isn't it? That's what it is to be a slave." They perform jobs that are considered too dangerous for humans to do on behalf of off-world colonies, such as heavy manual labour and combat, under the threat of death for disobedience. This becomes more disturbing when considering the so-called "pleasure models," which harkens the sexual abuse perpetrated by slaveowners in the United States. Explicit references to racism in are also made in the original release of the film. LAPD captain Bryant refers to the replicants as "skin jobs", whereupon Deckard's overdubbed narration explains "Skin jobs, that’s what Bryant called Replicants. In history books he is the kind of cop that used to call black men niggers."

Author Adilifu Nama suggested that the replicants in the film were "symbolically Black", stating that, as escaped slaves, they had the same socioeconomic status as enslaved Africans during the time of legalized slavery in America. Blade Runner distinctively features no primary Black characters, and, aside from two background characters at a bar, even the crowded city streets lack any apparent Black population. This is unusual when considering the overrepresentation of other non-White ethnicities in these same scenes.

Robert Barringer observed that the replicants in the film are coded Black and loosely fit popular Black stereotypes; he denoted Leon as representing the image of the quick-to-anger thuggish undereducated Black male, Zhora and Pris as lower-class prostitutes and Roy as a "smart, militant" Malcolm X type figure. Rachael, he wrote, acted as an "Oreo", a Black woman who is successfully able to act White, for she is programmed for this purpose. Thus, he compares the taboo of her and Deckard's relationship as akin to the taboo of interracial relationships. He interpreted both Tyrell and Sebastian as different types of slaveowners, "bad" and "good" respectively. Tyrell viewed replicants as lesser than, intentionally designing them for the function of the types of dangerous and demeaning labour aforementioned. Sebastian, despite calling the smaller toy-like replicants his "friends", has intentionally constructed inferior beings to him and is complicit in a system of slavery. Sebastian, despite his more friendly demeanour, still views replicants as objects. This is evidenced not only by his "friends", but in the way he speaks to Roy and Pris, asking "Show me something", viewing them as a source of intrigue or amusement rather than conscious beings. This, Barringer explains, is why both are killed by Roy.

== Deckard's ambiguous nature ==
Gaff's origami unicorn from The Final Cut, perhaps indicating that Deckard's unicorn dream was an implant and that Deckard is a replicant

The Director's Cut and The Final Cut include a sequence in which Deckard daydreams about a unicorn; in the final scene, he finds an origami unicorn on the floor outside his apartment, left there by Gaff, suggesting that Gaff knows about Deckard's dream in the same manner that Deckard knows about Rachael's implanted memories. Scott confirmed this interpretation was his intent. However, while memory implantation for replicants is established elsewhere in the movie, it is unclear whether daydreams work in the same way.

The movie contains other evidence and hints that Deckard is a replicant, though none proves he is inhuman:

- Deckard's apartment is full of photographs, none of them recent or in color. Replicants have a taste for photographs because it provides a tie to a non-existent past.
- Rachael asks, "You know that Voight-Kampff test of yours? Did you ever take that test yourself? Deckard?" By the time she says his name, Rachael finds that she had not received an answer because the injured, exhausted Deckard has fallen asleep.
- His fellow detective Gaff shows no sympathy for Deckard.
- After Roy expires, Gaff tells Deckard, "You've done a man's job, sir!"
- Deckard's eyes glow briefly in one scene, which was used in the film to subtly suggest his replicant identity. However, Ford denies this was an intentional effect; he may have caught some of the light intended to fall on Sean Young's eyes.

The purpose of this story as I saw it was that in his job of hunting and killing these replicants, Deckard becomes progressively dehumanized. At the same time, the replicants are being perceived as becoming more human. Finally, Deckard must question what he is doing, and really what is the essential difference between him and them? And, to take it one step further, who is he if there is no real difference?

— Philip K. Dick

Philip K. Dick wrote the character Deckard as a human in the original novel in order to explore the increasing similarity of humans and replicants; for example, the book states explicitly that Deckard passed the Voight-Kampff test. Screenwriter Hampton Fancher has said that he wrote the character as a human, but wanted the film to suggest the possibility that he may be a replicant. When asked, "Is Deckard a replicant?", Fancher replied, "No. It wasn't like I had a tricky idea about Deckard that way." During a discussion panel with Scott to discuss Blade Runner: The Final Cut, Fancher again stated that he believes Deckard is human (Scott's "idea is too complex"), but also repeated that he prefers the film to remain ambiguous.

Harrison Ford had stated over the years that he considered Deckard to be human. "That was the main area of contention between Ridley and myself at the time," Ford told an interviewer during a BBC One Hollywood Greats segment. "I thought the audience deserved one human being on screen that they could establish an emotional relationship with. I thought I had won Ridley's agreement to that, but in fact I think he had a little reservation about that. I think he really wanted to have it both ways." Scott suggests that Ford may have since changed his view, although Blade Runner 2049 director Denis Villeneuve claimed that Ford and Scott argue about the issue to this day. Other people involved in the movie's production who have expressed the view that Deckard is human include: David Snyder (art director), M. Emmet Walsh (who portrayed Bryant) and Rutger Hauer (who portrayed Roy Batty).

In a 2023 interview, Ford stated that he "always knew" that Deckard was a replicant, but wanted to "push back against it", adding that a replicant (or at least, Deckard) would want to believe that they are human.

Ridley Scott stated in several interviews that he considers Deckard to be a replicant. Syd Mead, the film's visual futurist, agreed with Scott that Deckard is a replicant. Douglas Trumbull, the film's visual effects supervisor, stated that he does not know Deckard's true nature and that the issue is an enigma. Similarly, Villeneuve also noted that in 2049, Deckard "is unsure, as we are, of what his identity is".

== See also ==
- List of adaptations of works by Philip K. Dick
