= A Marvel Comics Super Special: Blade Runner =

Comic book adaptation of Blade Runner

- Cover to Blade Runner #1, art by Al Williamson.

Publication information
- Publisher: Marvel Comics
- Publication date: 1982
- Main character: Rick Deckard

Creative team
- Written by: Archie Goodwin
- Artist(s): Al Williamson; Ralph Reese
- Penciller(s): Al Williamson; Carlos Garzon
- Inker(s): Al Williamson; Ralph Reese; Dan Green letterer Ed King
- Colorist: Marie Severin
- Editor: Jim Salicrup

Marvel Comics Super Special: Blade Runner or just Blade Runner is a comic book adaptation of the film Blade Runner, published by Marvel Comics in 1982. It was written by Archie Goodwin with art by Al Williamson, Carlos Garzon with Dan Green and Ralph Reese.

== Publication history ==
With a cover by Jim Steranko, the 45-page adaptation includes one possible explanation of the title's significance in story context: the narrative line, "Blade runner. You're always movin' on the edge."

This was issue 22 of the Marvel Comics Super Special series of titles, which by this time only printed Marvel's movie adaptations. It was reprinted in a two issue mini series but without the feature content contained in the special.

In the United Kingdom, it was reprinted as the Blade Runner Annual published by Grandreams. Again, the feature content of the original special was not reprinted.

In the Netherlands, a Dutch language version of this comic was printed by Junior Press.

The mass market paperback was published in black and white and contains images from the film, it is one of the rarest Marvel Comics paperbacks.

== Plot ==
The comic followed the events of the film but attempts to fill in gaps in the script.

== Reception ==
According to author Lawrence Raw, the Marvel adaptation was poorly received and widely ridiculed as having bad writing and misquoted lines of dialogue from the film script. Julian Darius of Sequart stated that "most movie adaptations aren’t great comics in their own right, and the Blade Runner adaptation’s no different" but also noted that "the adaptation is something of a mixed bag, but the more time one spends with it, the more one likes it."

== Editions ==
=== Original single ===
Name	Tie-in to	Pages	Publication dates
A Marvel Comics Super Special: Blade Runner	Blade Runner (film)	64	September 1982

=== Reprinted issues ===
No.	Title	Cover date	Notes
#1	Blade Runner	October 1982	
#2	Blade Runner	November 1982	Cover by Brent Anderson.

=== Collected edition ===
Title	Format	Material collected	Pages	Publication date	ISBN
Blade Runner, Volume 1	Paperback	Blade Runner #1–2	159	1982	ISBN 9780939766109

== See also ==
- Do Androids Dream of Electric Sheep? (comic book)
- Dust to Dust (comics)
