= Want (novel) =

2017 young adult science fiction novel

Want is a 2017 young adult science fiction novel about a futuristic Taipei, written by Cindy Pon and published by Simon Pulse. In 2017 it was nominated for the Andre Norton Nebula Award for Middle Grade and Young Adult Fiction in 2017.

Its sequel, Ruse, was published in 2019.

== Critical reception ==
Paste Magazine named the book one of the best young adult novels of 2017, praising its "Blade-Runner-esque world building to the heart-pounding stakes."

Kirkus Reviews calls the novel "[a]n exciting, socially conscious futuristic thriller."

School Library Journal praises the book's "supporting cast of diverse and intelligent characters with relationships rooted in loyalty" and calls it a "solid addition to any library."

Strange Horizons writes, "the strength of the book lies in the world it draws and the characters who fill it."

The Bulletin of the Center for Children's Books calls the novel a "gripping, fast read."
