= Blade Runner 2033: Labyrinth =

Upcoming video game

- Developer: Annapurna Interactive
- Publishers: Annapurna Interactive; Alcon Interactive Group
- Series: Blade Runner
- Platforms: Windows; Other consoles
- Release: Unknown

Blade Runner 2033: Labyrinth was an unreleased adventure game that was announced as being developed and published by Alcon Interactive Group and Annapurna Interactive's internal studio, led by game director Chelsea Hash. Aside from being Annapurna's first in-house developed game, it was also going to be the first Blade Runner game for consoles and PC in development since Blade Runner in 1997.

== Plot ==
The game is set in a dystopian Los Angeles after the Blackout, between the original 1982 film, Blade Runner, and the 2017 sequel, Blade Runner 2049, and approximately a year after the events of the 2021 anime Blade Runner: Black Lotus.

== Development ==
On June 22, 2022, Annapurna Interactive tapped Solar Ash game director Chelsea Hash to develop an unannounced project developed in-house by the studio in 2020 with a fairly small team consisting of technical director Brett Lajzer, senior producer Evan Hembacher, art director Cosimo Galluzzi and environment artist Nate Grove. During the June 2023 Annapurna Interactive Showcase, it was announced that the project they worked on was a Blade Runner narrative video game. It shares themes between the films and takes place after the anime Blade Runner: Black Lotus, largely focused on honing and taking details from the original film's production and the source material from the novel.

In September 2024, the status of the game was put into question after Annapurna Interactive's internal development team had resigned amid mass resignations at Annapurna Interactive following a power struggle at the studio. However, following the resignations Annapurna Interactive would later reiterate that it planned to continue development and release the game despite the resignations.

On December 10, 2025, the game was delisted from Steam, and, as of December 17, the game no longer has a page on Annapurna's official website. This led to speculation that the game was cancelled.
