= We Can Build You =

1972 novel by Philip K. Dick

- Cover of first edition (paperback)
- Author: Philip K. Dick
- Cover artist: John Schoenherr
- Language: English
- Genre: Science fiction
- Publisher: DAW Books
- Publication date: 1972
- Publication place: United States
- Media type: Print (hardback & paperback)
- Pages: 206
- ISBN: 0-679-75296-X (recent edition)
- OCLC: 29428716
- Dewey Decimal: 813/.54 20
- LC Class: PS3554.I3 W4 1994

We Can Build You is a 1972 science fiction novel by American writer Philip K. Dick. Written in 1962 as The First in Our Family, it remained unpublished until appearing in serial form as A. Lincoln, Simulacrum in the November 1969 and January 1970 issues of Amazing Stories magazine, re-titled by editor Ted White. The novel was issued as a mass market paperback original by DAW Books in 1972, its final title provided by publisher Donald A. Wollheim. Its first hardcover edition was published in Italy in 1976, and Vintage issued a trade paperback in 1994.

The magazine version of the story includes a brief closing chapter written by Ted White and very lightly copyedited by Dick. The Amazing editor felt that Dick's text did not properly complete the novel, and so he sent a draft conclusion to Dick, expecting him to overhaul it. Dick instead approved White's coda as written and altered only a few words. This final chapter, which Dick later expressed disapproval over, was not included when the novel was published in book form.

== Plot summary ==
We Can Build You is set in the then-future year of 1982. It centers on Louis Rosen, a small businessman whose company produces spinets and electronic organs. Rosen's partner wants to begin production of simulacra, or androids, based on famous American Civil War figures. The firm completes two prototypes, one of Edwin M. Stanton and one of Abraham Lincoln. Rosen then attempts to sell the robot patents to Sam K. Barrows, an influential businessman who is opening up lunar real estate for purchase and colonization. Unfortunately, while the Stanton simulacrum proves able to adapt to contemporary U.S. society, the Lincoln simulacrum proves unable to do so, possibly because the original experienced schizophrenia. At the same time, Louis begins a relationship with Pris Frauenzimmer, the schizophrenic daughter of his business partner, who has designed both simulacra. This becomes an obsession and Louis himself begins to hallucinate about Pris.

At the same time, Pris defects to Barrows but then loses faith in the benevolence of their partnership when his objectives are disclosed as more prosaic than hers, with his plans to use simulacra colonists to entice human settlement on the Moon and other human interplanetary colonies within the Solar System. After Pris's destruction of a John Wilkes Booth prototype simulacrum, the Stanton/Lincoln simulacra strand of the plot abruptly terminates.

The remainder of the book deals with Louis Rosen's admission of schizophrenia and his Jungian therapeutic treatment at the Kasanin Centre in Kansas from where Pris was originally released. Under the influence of his therapist Rosen creates a virtual hallucinatory reality of his own where he resumes his relationship with Pris, marries her, has children and grows old together with her, finally culminating with him hitting her hallucinatory doppelgänger in a fit of pique. This concludes his final therapy session and he is released from the Kasanin clinic after his doctor accuses him of malingering. The end of the novel posits the query of whether he was actually insane to begin with. The real-world Pris, however, has become unwell again, and she is returned to Kasanin following her short-lived career as a simulacra designer.

== Reception ==
Theodore Sturgeon gave We Can Build You a mixed review, praising Dick on the "handling of his characters, who are consistent and warmly recognizable even in their stubborn irrationalities, on the boldness and provocation of his themes [and] on the richness of his auctorial background and the sparkles of laughter finger-flicked all over his work." He concluded, though, that Dick's "willingness to pursue some collateral and fascinating line at the expense -- and even the abandonment -- of his central theme" weakened the novel.

Dave Langford reviewed We Can Build You for White Dwarf #76, and stated that "Dick's underdog humour - little people against the world - is here, but overall it's a dark book. Behind the (irrelevant) robot Hitler on the cover, Chris Foss has painted a robot Philip K Dick. . . ."

Gregg Rickman asserts that We Can Build You can be read as a prequel to Do Androids Dream of Electric Sheep?, Dick's more famous novel that also deals with androids.
