= Deus Ex Machina (heavy metal band) =

Singaporean band

- Origin: Singapore
- Genres: Melodic death metal, thrash metal, progressive metal
- Years active: 2004–present
- Label: Independent
- Members: Prashant Ryan Joseph; Syarmilla Javer; Badr; Jussi Ahokas; Neil Halliday
- Past members: Shailendra Singh; Anand Sinniah; David Varghese; Mithun MK; Justin Herson; Thomas Leow; Tharenii; Caspar Francis; Daniel Dugard; Rory Slingo; Gene Yeo; Mak WK
- Website: Deus Ex Machina on Facebook

Deus Ex Machina is a Singaporean death metal/thrash metal band, and is one of the few extreme metal acts from Southeast Asia that has gained a following in Europe and the United States. They represent a rarity in the Southeast Asian Metal scenes in favouring a more melodic musical approach and concept-based poetic lyrics in contrast to the more aggressive and brutal stylings of the region. They are also a highly internationalized band, with a background of having band members from different parts of the world.

== History ==
Deus Ex Machina (DEM) was formed in early 2004 when Ryan, the ex-lead guitarist for Azra-el and Bhelliom started writing and rehearsing music with Lincoln on drums and Justin (Fen-rir) on second guitar. Due to their inability to commit, they were replaced by Gene (Truth Be Known, Bhelliom) on drums and Mak (ex-Angel of Sin) on bass. As a 3-piece, the band decided to carry on writing and by the time recording came around, the band chose to enlist different singers to give the album a more diverse feel. Kathi (Rudra), Subash (Kaliyuga, Truth Be Known), Vivek (Bhelliom), Lord Insanity (Meltgsnow) and Marie Emily (M.E) came on board for this project to lend their vocals, with Ryan putting vocals on one track. The debut album of 7 songs was entitled The War Inside. The album was recorded at TNT Music Studios in Singapore, with KK Wong, Engineering and Co-Producing the album. The first album was humanistic in nature, considering everything from war and religion to books such as Prozac Nation and The Da Vinci Code.

Between October 2006 to December 2007, the band gigs with Ryan being joined by new members Shailendra on drums, Mithun on vocals, Daniel on bass and Rory on guitars. They recorded a self-titled EP that was self-released to limited copies, as a prelude to the follow-up to The War Inside. They play shows with international acts Truth Corroded, Sludge, Hydrophobia, Defiled.

Throughout 2008 and 2009, Deus ex Machina commenced work on their second album, I, Human, with new members Tharenii and Caspar from Stillborn filling in on guitars and bass respectively. The album is set in the death metal/thrash metal mould with melodic and progressive metal structures included. The lyrical content of the album deals with the cloning: specifically, questions regarding its use, legality, implications and the possibility of a world full of clones fighting to gain their own identity. The concept was based on the medium of Isaac Asimov's novel I, Robot.

The band toured Indonesia, Malaysia and Thailand throughout 2010 and 2011. In 2012, they embarked on a mini-tour of Australia, playing alongside Octanic and State of Integrity. The band has since undergone another line-up change, with the return of founding member Prashant Joseph. Adding to the lineup between 2015 and 2019 were Vivek Govind (vocals, ex-Bhelliom), Jussi Ahokas (bass), Herman Razr Lee (guitars) and Neil Halliday (drums). The revamped line-up seeks a 2020 release date for their third album.

== Musical style ==
Deus ex Machina's musical style is derived from a multitude of influences. The genres that the band has been affiliated with are melodic death metal, progressive metal, and thrash metal. The band is also known for its intelligent and poetic lyrical concept. The band has indicated their influences to be Martyr, Death, Carcass, Meshuggah, Iron Maiden, Dream Theater, Nevermore, among others.

== Band members ==
=== Current ===
- Prashant Ryan Joseph – lead guitar (2004–2012, 2014–present)
- Neil Halliday – drums (2019–present)
- Herman Rzar Lee – rhythm guitar (2016–present)
- Vivek Govind – lead vocals (2014–present)
- Jussi Ahokas – bass (2017–present)

=== Former ===
- Shailendra Singh – drums (2006–2019)
- Mithun MK – lead vocals (2006–2014)
- David Varghese – bass (2011–2014)
- Justin Henderson – lead guitar (2012–2014)
- Thomas Leow – bass (2009–2011)
- Tharenii – rhythm guitar (2008–2009)
- Caspar Francis – bass (2008–2009)
- Rory Slingo – guitar (2006–2008)
- Daniel Dugard – bass (2006–2008)
- Gene – drums (2004–2006)
- Mak – bass (2004–2006)
- Anandan Sinniah – rhythm guitar (2009–2014)

Timeline

== Discography ==
- The War Inside (Album, 2006)
- Deus Ex Machina (EP, 2007)
- I, Human (Album, 2009)
- ||| (Album,2022)
