= Blade Runner 4: Eye and Talon =

2000 novel by K. W. Jeter

- Author: K. W. Jeter
- Language: English
- Series: Blade Runner
- Genre: Science fiction
- Publisher: Bantam Spectra
- Publication date: 2000
- Publication place: United States
- Media type: Print (paperback)
- Pages: 288
- ISBN: 0-575-06865-5
- Preceded by: Blade Runner 3: Replicant Night

Blade Runner 4: Eye and Talon is a 2000 science fiction novel by American writer K. W. Jeter. It is the third and final installment in the authorized Blade Runner continuation series, following Blade Runner 3: Replicant Night (1996). The novel continues the story of Rick Deckard and other characters as a Blade Runner named Iris investigates Scrappy, the pet owl of the late Eldon Tyrell, in the aftermath of Deckard's disappearance.

== Plot ==
Blade Runner Iris is amongst the most proficient members of her unit. Her superior, Meyer, informs her that due to the number of fugitive replicants from off-world escaping to Earth dwindling, the Blade Runner unit's value is coming into question, risking "reorganization." Meyer assigns Iris to locate and recover Scrappy, a real owl (an extreme rarity) formerly owned by the late Eldon Tyrell. Investigating Meyer's leads, Iris discovers that few records of former Blade Runner Rick Deckard survive. In her search, she is met by the enigmatic Vogel, who guides her to Scrappy's dwelling in a derelict, abandoned theater. Despite recovering the owl, Iris questions Vogel's motives for willingly helping her and hides Scrappy in her apartment. Scrappy is stolen while Iris is overcome by her artificial cat, which was booby-trapped. For this mishap Meyer terminates Iris from the division.

Via a data-encoded ring from a chain that fastened Scrappy to its perch, Iris is led to the ruins of the Tyrell Corporation, where Vogel reveals details about Tyrell's murder and shows Iris a recording of the Blade Runner film's events in a documentary format. Iris is astonished to discover that she and Rachael are a physical match. Before Vogel can explain, they are pursued by a fleet of spinners, and Iris is captured. Taken to a hidden desert facility, Iris meets the elderly Carsten, who claims that Tyrell was not a pioneer in replicant production, and merely obtained the necessary technology when rival manufacturers were forced into closing by the United Nations. He explains that Tyrell formulated a method to direct human consciousness into replicant bodies, thus achieving immortality via a sequence of replicants. According to Carsten, Roy Batty deliberately blinded Tyrell to prevent this, as the eyes were crucial for his consciousness's preservation. Scrappy carries a backup of Tyrell's mind, and a replicant could become his vessel.

When Carsten reveals an eyeless duplicate of Iris for this purpose, she destroys the duplicate. Two intruders break into the base, and fatally shoot Carsten. One is revealed as Meyer, who leaves having assumed the dead duplicate was Iris. He is overheard conversing with someone and then shooting them. Fleeing the compound, Iris learns that the other assailant was Vogel, and he and Meyer have killed almost everyone in the base. Scrappy alights on another man, whom Iris recognizes as Rick Deckard, with the child Rachael in tow. They explain that Deckard stole Scrappy from Iris’s apartment for her own safety. When Iris asks if Deckard will take her back to Los Angeles, Rachael states Iris has never been there before. Deckard points up to the sky, remarking "Those aren't the stars you see from Earth." The three depart from the scene in Deckard's spinner.

== Publication ==
The novel was published in 2000 as a paperback original by Bantam Spectra in the United States. It concludes the Blade Runner continuation trilogy started with Blade Runner 2: The Edge of Human and continued in Blade Runner 3: Replicant Night, completing Jeter’s authorized extension of the Blade Runner universe.

== Reception ==
Some criticism was directed at the density of the novel's plot and the abundance of conspiratorial elements, believing the novel to be the weakest of Jeter's sequels. Nevertheless, the novel was regarded as enjoyable for fans of Dick's work.
