= I, Human =

Studio album by Deus Ex Machina
- Released: 2009
- Genres: Melodic death metal, thrash metal, progressive metal
- Length: 36:54
- Label: Independent
- Producer: KK Wong

Deus Ex Machina chronology
The War Inside (2006)	I, Human (2009)	III (2022)

I, Human is the second full-length album by Singaporean death metal band, Deus Ex Machina, and the first to feature a permanent vocalist, giving it more uniformity in contrast to The War Inside, which had a different singer for each track. Musically, it is an edgy mixture of thrash metal, melodic death metal and progressive metal interjections, coupled with a diversified vocal approach. The lyrical content of the album deals with the future: Cloning. Specifically, questions regarding its use, legality, implications and the possibility of a world full of clones fighting to gain their own identity. The concept is based on Isaac Asimov's novel I, Robot, but also is influenced by other science fiction works such as Blade Runner, The 6th Day, A.I. Artificial Intelligence, and Warhammer 40,000. Each songs discusses the ethical issues pertaining to cloning, shifting from first person to second person to third person perspective. The band further divulges the mind frame of an unnamed clone character as it gradually realizes it is a clone, upon awaking from what it thought was a dream. In their pursuit of equality and acceptance, the band delves deep into their thoughts, fears, and plans, channeling these emotions into a powerful auditory experience accompanied by thought-provoking lyrics.

== Track listing ==
1. M(n)emo(nic)ries – 1:58
2. The Mask – 3:42
3. Replicant – 5:47
4. Jigsaw – 4:52
5. The Human Strain – 2:45
6. I – 5:19
7. The Omega Directive – 3:53
8. Assent / Dissent – 5:30
9. Hidden Track – 3:08

== Personnel ==
- Ryan Prashant Joseph – guitar
- Shailendra Singh – drums
- Mithun MK – lead vocals
- Caspar Francis – bass
