= Blade Runner 3: Replicant Night =

1996 novel by K. W. Jeter

- Author: K. W. Jeter
- Language: English
- Series: Blade Runner
- Genre: Science fiction
- Publisher: Bantam Spectra
- Publication date: 1996
- Publication place: United States
- Media type: Print (paperback)
- Pages: 277
- ISBN: 0-553-09983-3
- Preceded by: Blade Runner 2: The Edge of Human
- Followed by: Blade Runner 4: Eye and Talon

Blade Runner 3: Replicant Night is a 1996 science fiction novel by American writer K. W. Jeter. It is the second entry in a trilogy of authorized continuation novels inspired by Philip K. Dick’s 1968 novel Do Androids Dream of Electric Sheep? and the film Blade Runner (1982). The novel continues the story of Rick Deckard as he becomes entangled in conspiracies involving advanced replicant technology, corporate interests, and the uncertain boundary between human and artificial life.

== Background ==
Following the publication of Blade Runner 2: The Edge of Human (1995), Jeter continued to explore the philosophical concerns central to Dick’s fiction, particularly the instability of identity and the ethical implications of artificial life. The continuation novels were authorized by the Dick estate and attempt to reconcile elements of both the original novel and the film adaptation.

== Plot ==
Following the events of The Edge of Human, Rick Deckard travels off-world with Sarah Tyrell, a woman who had impersonated Rachael. Deckard accepts employment as a consultant for a film studio producing a dramatization of his career as a blade runner. During production, Deckard discovers that a replicant actor portraying Leon is killed on camera with live ammunition as part of an unauthorized intervention orchestrated by a figure named Marley. Deckard’s former colleague Dave Holden attempts to deliver a mysterious suitcase to him but is captured by studio personnel and subjected to a staged reenactment of his earlier Voight-Kampff interview with Leon, which culminates in Holden being shot.

Deckard retrieves the suitcase, which is revealed to contain an artificial personality construct modeled on Roy Batty. The construct explains that a network of replicant sympathizers seeks Deckard’s assistance in delivering encrypted information to replicants living in distant off-world colonies. The data originates from research by J. R. Isidore, who had developed procedures enabling replicants to pass empathy testing by suppressing awareness of their artificial origins while embedding concealed activation codes. These codes could restore the replicants’ memories and facilitate organized resistance.

Meanwhile, Sarah Tyrell resides on Mars, where the limited sensory stimulation of the colony has contributed to her psychological instability. Agents representing a clandestine continuation of the Tyrell Corporation approach Sarah and persuade her to investigate the wreckage of the Salander 3, an experimental spacecraft connected to her origins. According to Tyrell records, the vessel had undertaken a mission toward distant colonies but mysteriously returned to Earth with Sarah as its sole survivor. While exploring the derelict ship, Sarah encounters disturbing traces of violence and a young girl identical to Rachael, whom she initially believes to be a hallucination. Evidence suggests that Anson Tyrell, Sarah’s father, murdered Ruth Tyrell before taking his own life under unexplained psychological pressures. Sarah ultimately kills the Tyrell agents escorting her and escapes with the child.

Deckard learns that the suitcase also contains sensory capsules preserving the consciousness of genetic engineer J. F. Sebastian. By ingesting the capsules, Deckard experiences a simulated reconstruction of Sebastian’s former residence, where Sebastian reveals that the mission to the colonies may determine the future distinction between humans and replicants. Sebastian provides Deckard with a seemingly ordinary first-aid kit, implying that it contains information essential to understanding the larger conspiracy.

Deckard reunites with Sarah and the child Rachael on Mars, but tensions escalate as Sarah becomes convinced that the girl is an illusion engineered to destabilize her. Deckard departs with the child after narrowly avoiding being killed by Sarah. Marley later confronts Deckard and reveals that the suitcase mission has been covertly manipulated by governmental authorities rather than replicant sympathizers. According to Marley, replicants living in remote colonies have begun to exceed their designed lifespan and have demonstrated the capacity to reproduce biologically. Conversely, humans living in these environments have experienced declining fertility and increased frailty, blurring the biological distinction between humans and replicants.

The encrypted data in the suitcase contains a signal capable of activating latent behavioral programming within male replicants that would compel them to destroy their own offspring, thereby preventing the emergence of replicant populations independent of human control. During an armed confrontation, Marley destroys the suitcase to prevent the activation signal from reaching the colonies, but government forces seize the child Rachael and transport her back to Earth.

Deckard tracks the child to the film studio, where the production has been reconfigured to depict Deckard’s death as propaganda reinforcing anti-replicant sentiment. On a reconstructed set resembling Sebastian’s Bradbury Building residence, Deckard confronts Sarah and reveals evidence from the first-aid kit indicating that Sarah and Rachael are twin daughters born aboard the Salander 3. The mission had secretly tested whether replicants engineered without awareness of their artificial nature could reproduce in deep-space conditions. Anson Tyrell, himself a replicant subject, experienced a programmed behavioral response resembling an exaggerated form of stepfather syndrome, leading him to murder Ruth Tyrell before killing himself. Rachael survived in suspended animation while Sarah returned to Earth unaware of her origin. Confronted with proof of her identity as a replicant born through natural reproduction, Sarah abandons her attempt to kill Deckard. Overcome by the implications of her existence, she dies by suicide. Deckard leaves the studio with the child Rachael, uncertain of their future as the distinction between human and replicant continues to erode.

== Themes ==
The novel develops recurring themes found in Dick's work: ambiguity between human and artificial consciousness, corporate influence on technological development, constructed identity, and empathy as a moral benchmark. Jeter’s continuation emphasizes the erosion of clear distinctions between natural and artificial beings, a concern central to the original novel.

== Publication history ==
The novel was published in 1996 as a paperback original. It forms part of a trilogy written by Jeter between 1995 and 2000.

== Reception ==
Critical discussion of the continuation novels has generally focused on their attempt to extend Dick’s thematic concerns while remaining consistent with the continuity of Blade Runner. Some commentators have noted the increased emphasis on conspiracy elements compared with the original novel’s more introspective tone.
