= Blade Runner 2: The Edge of Human =

1995 science fiction novel by K. W. Jeter

- Cover of the first edition
- Author: K. W. Jeter
- Language: English
- Series: Blade Runner
- Genre: Science fiction
- Publisher: Bantam (first US trade edition); Orion (first UK edition)
- Publication date: October 1, 1995
- Publication place: United States
- Media type: Print (Hardcover, Paperback)
- Pages: 340
- ISBN: 0-553-09979-5
- OCLC: 32548543
- Dewey Decimal: 813/.54 20
- LC Class: PS3560.E85 B58 1995
- Preceded by: Do Androids Dream of Electric Sheep?
- Followed by: Replicant Night

Blade Runner 2: The Edge of Human (1995) is a science fiction novel by American writer K. W. Jeter. It is a continuation of both the film Blade Runner and the novel upon which the film was based, Philip K. Dick's Do Androids Dream of Electric Sheep?

== Plot ==
Several months after the events depicted in Blade Runner, Deckard has retired to an isolated shack outside the city, taking the replicant Rachael with him in a Tyrell transport container, which slows down the replicant aging process. He is approached by a woman who explains she is Sarah Tyrell, niece of Eldon Tyrell, heiress to the Tyrell Corporation and the human template ("templant") for the Rachael replicant. She asks Deckard to hunt down the "missing" sixth replicant. At the same time, the templant for Roy Batty hires Dave Holden, the blade runner attacked by Leon, to help him hunt down the man he believes is the sixth replicant—Deckard.

Deckard and Holden's investigations lead them to re-visit Sebastian, Bryant, and John Isidore (from the book Do Androids Dream Of Electric Sheep?), learning more about the nature of the blade runners and the replicants.

When Deckard, Batty, and Holden finally clash, Batty's super-human fighting prowess leads Holden to believe he has been duped all along and that Batty is the sixth replicant, leading to Holden shooting him. Deckard returns to Sarah with his suspicion: there is no sixth replicant. Sarah, speaking via a remote camera, confesses that she invented and maintained the rumor herself in order to deliberately discredit and eventually destroy the Tyrell Corporation because her uncle Eldon had based Rachel on her and then abandoned the real Sarah. Sarah brings Rachael back to the Corporation to meet with Deckard, and they escape.

However, Holden, recovering from his injuries during the fight, later uncovers the truth: Rachael has been killed by Tyrell agents, and the "Rachael" who escaped with Deckard was actually Sarah. She has completed her revenge by both destroying Tyrell and taking back Rachael's place.

== Characters ==
- Rick Deckard: The Tyrell Corporation finally locates him, residing at a cabin in the woods with the frozen Rachael. In exchange for getting Rachael back, Deckard agrees to hunt the missing sixth replicant.
- Roy Batty: The man which Tyrell used as the template for his combat replicants is in fact a man of considerable instability, suffering from a brain disorder that prevents him from experiencing fear.
- Sarah Tyrell: The niece of Eldon Tyrell, Sarah locates and hires Deckard to eliminate the final replicant in order to retain her corporation's hold over the market.
- Dave Holden: Starting off bed-ridden after his attack by the replicant Leon, Holden is rescued by Roy who in turn leads him to some startling revelations.
- J.R. Isidore: A lowly employee of a vet's office, Isidore also works as an underground replicant sympathizer, having made modifications to replicants in order to help them escape detection.

== Relationship to other works ==
The book's plot draws from other material related to Blade Runner in a number of ways:

- Deckard, Pris, Sebastian, Leon, Batty, and Holden all appeared in Blade Runner.
- Many of the parts of the "conspiracy" are based on errors or plot holes identified by fans of the original movie, such as Leon's ability to bring a gun into the Tyrell building, or the reference to the sixth replicant.
- The character of John Isidore, and his "pet hospital", is taken from Dick's original novel Do Androids Dream of Electric Sheep?, although that book contained no suggestion that the shop ran a sideline in modifying replicants.
- Blade Runner's Sebastian was based on Electric Sheep's Isidore, though Jeter features them as separate characters in The Edge of Human.
- The idea of replicant models being mass-produced, and in particular a woman identical to Rachael existing, is also from Do Androids Dream of Electric Sheep?; although in that book, Pris was the replicant double of Rachael, and there was no suggestion that replicants were constructed based on human templates.
- The etymology of the term "blade runner" is revealed to come from the German phrase bleib ruhig, meaning "remain calm." It was supposedly developed by the Tyrell Corporation to prevent news about replicants malfunctioning.

However, it also contradicts material in some ways:

- Sebastian was stated as being dead in the movie, yet he is alive in The Edge of Human.
- Pris was clearly stated as being a replicant in both the movie and the original novel, yet The Edge of Human claims she was human.
- Pris was clearly destroyed by Deckard in both the movie and the original novel. Sebastian's ability to bring Pris back to life as a replicant introduces numerous problems: the book implies that Sebastian was able to do this without realising that her original body was human. It is likewise unclear why Deckard would have left her, or any suspected replicant he retired, in a state from which they could be repaired.
- "The Final Cut" of Blade Runner removed the reference of a surviving sixth replicant, as it was normally considered a leftover from an early script.

== Reception ==
Michael Giltz of Entertainment Weekly gave the book a "C−", feeling that "only hardcore fans will be satisfied by this tale" and saying Jeter's "habit of echoing dialogue and scenes from the film is annoying and begs comparisons he would do well to avoid." Tal Cohen of Tal Cohen's Bookshelf called The Edge of Human "a good book", praising Jeter's "further, and deeper, investigation of the questions Philip K. Dick originally asked", but criticized the book for its "needless grandioseness" and for "rel[ying] on Blade Runner too heavily, [as] the number of new characters introduced is extremely small..."

Ian Kaplan of BearCave.com gave the book three stars out of five, saying that while he was "not entirely satisfied" and felt that the "story tends to be shallow", "Jeter does deal with the moral dilemma of the Blade Runners who hunt down beings that are virtually human in every way." J. Patton of The Bent Cover praised Jeter for "[not] try[ing] to emulate Philip K. Dick", adding, "This book also has all the grittiness and dark edges that the movie showed off so well, along with a very fast pace that will keep you reading into the wee hours of the night."

== Failed film adaptation ==
In the late 1990s, Edge of Human had been adapted into a screenplay by Stuart Hazeldine, Blade Runner Down, that was to be filmed as the sequel to the 1982 film Blade Runner. Ultimately neither this script nor the Jeter novel were used for the eventual sequel, Blade Runner 2049, which follows a different story.

== See also ==
- Blade Runner: Do Androids Dream of Electric Sheep? – original story by P K Dick
- Blade Runner: A Story of the Future – film novelization by Les Martin
- Blade Runner 3: Replicant Night – K. W. Jeter
- Blade Runner 4: Eye and Talon – K. W. Jeter
