= Do Androids Dream of Electric Sheep? (comic book) =

Comic book series

Publication information
- Publisher: BOOM! Studios
- Schedule: Monthly
- Format: Limited series
- Publication date: 2009

Creative team
- Written by: Philip K. Dick
- Artist: Tony Parker

Do Androids Dream of Electric Sheep? is a 24 issue comic book limited series published by BOOM! Studios in 2009. It is an adaptation of Philip K. Dick's novel by the same name and was drawn by Tony Parker. The series was nominated for an Eisner Award in the category Best New Series.

== Reception ==
The series holds an average rating of 7.0 by 13 professional critics on the review aggregation website Comic Book Roundup. The series received a nomination for Best New Series at the Eisner Awards.

== Prints ==
=== Issues ===
No.	Title	Volume	Cover date	Comic Book Roundup rating	Estimated sales (first month)	Notes
#1	Rick Deckard	Vol. 1		7.1 by seven professional critics.		
#2	Nexus-6	Vol. 1		5.0 by one professional critic.		
#3	A Stranger Arrives	Vol. 1		—N/a		
#4	Hannibal Sloat	Vol. 1		8.0 by one professional critic.		
#5	Horace	Vol. 2		—N/a		
#6	The Hunt For Polokov	Vol. 2		—N/a		
#7	A New Kind Of Handgun	Vol. 2		—N/a		
#8	The Magic Flute	Vol. 2		—N/a		
#9	Who Is Rick Deckard?	Vol. 3		—N/a		
#10	The Hall Of Justice	Vol. 3		9.0 by one professional critic.		
#11	Android In Sheep's Clothing	Vol. 3		8.0 by one professional critic.		
#12	The Scream	Vol. 3		—N/a		
#13	The Truth About Phil Resch	Vol. 4		—N/a		
#14	No Man Is An Island	Vol. 4		—N/a		
#15	Roy Baty	Vol. 4		—N/a		
#16	Androids, Chickenheads & Nubian Goats	Vol. 4		—N/a		
#17	There Is No Salvation	Vol. 5		—N/a		
#18	Rendezvous At The St. Francis	Vol. 5		—N/a		
#19	He Got Into Bed	Vol. 5		4.0 by one professional critic.		
#20	Room Service	Vol. 5		—N/a		
#21	The Truth About Mercerism	Vol. 6		—N/a		
#22	Retirement	Vol. 6		—N/a		
#23	...Had A Great Fall	Vol. 6		8.0 by one professional critic.		
#24	Toad (Bufonidae), All Varieties....E.	Vol. 6		—N/a		

=== Collected editions ===
"Do Androids Dream of Electric Sheep? Omnibus" by P. K. Dick, Tony Parker, Blond, Richard Starkings; 2015, 640 pages, Boom Entertainment [includes all 24 issues], ISBN 978-1608867844

"Do Androids Dream of Electric Sheep?", 6 collector's volumes of the 24 issues, 2009-2011

- Vol. 1, #1-#4, 139 pages, Nov. 2009, ISBN 978-1608865000
- Vol. 2, #5-#8, 134 pages, Feb. 2010, ISBN 978-1608865093
- Vol. 3, #9-#12, 134 pages, Aug. 2010, ISBN 978-1608865772
- Vol. 4, #13-#16, 133 pages, Feb. 2011, ISBN 978-1608866151
- Vol. 5, #17-#20, 135 pages, ISBN 978-1608866403
- Vol. 6, #21-#24, 133 pages, Oct. 2011, ISBN 978-1608866410

== See also ==
- Works by Philip K. Dick
