= Dust to Dust (comic) =

Comic book limited series

- Cover for issue 1, art by Trevor Hairsine.

Publication information
- Publisher: BOOM! Studios
- Schedule: Monthly
- Format: Limited series
- Publication date: 2010
- No. of issues: 8

Creative team
- Written by: Chris Roberson
- Artist: Robert Adler
- Penciller: Robert Adler
- Inker: Robert Adler
- Letterer: James Betancourt
- Colorist(s): Andrés Lozano; Javier Suppa
- Editor: Bryce Carlson

Dust to Dust or Do Androids Dream of Electric Sheep?: Dust to Dust is an 8 issue comic book limited series published by BOOM! Studios in 2010. The series is a prequel to the story of Do Androids Dream of Electric Sheep? The series was written by Chris Roberson and drawn by Robert Adler.

== Publication history ==
The series was marketed with a sneak peek of an eight-page digital preview which was released on iPad, iPhone and iPod Touch.

== Plot ==
The story took place in the days immediately after World War Terminus.

== Reception ==
The series holds an average rating of 7.7 by eight professional critics on the review aggregation website Comic Book Roundup. James Orbesen of PopMatters gave the series a positive review, stating: "Dust to Dust is a fine prequel that doesn’t really rock the foundations of its source material. But I imagine this project was never intended to perform that function. What this comic does achieve is broadening one of science fiction’s most beloved tales through philosophical discourse, not moody atmospherics or pulse pounding action. A nice piece of the canon that doesn’t upset or offend." Chad Nevett who reviewed most of the issues for Comic Book Resources expressed that while he doubted the series validity upon its original announcement he greatly enjoyed the series when he actually read it.

== Prints ==
=== Issues ===
No.	Title	Cover date	Comic Book Roundup rating	Estimated sales (first month)	Notes
#1	—N/a	May 2010	7.3 by three professional critics.	5,449, ranked 241st in North America	
#2	—N/a	June 2010	9.0 by two professional critics.	—N/a	
#3	—N/a	July 2010	—N/a	4,048, ranked 284th in North America	Alternative cover by Benjamin Carre.
#4	—N/a	August 2010	—N/a	3,918, ranked 265th in North America	
#5	—N/a	September 2010	—N/a	—N/a	
#6	—N/a	October 2010	8.0 by one professional critic.	3,781, ranked 290th in North America	
#7	—N/a	November 2010	—N/a	—N/a	
#8	—N/a	December 2010	6.5 by two professional critic.	3,470, ranked 234th in North America	

=== Collected editions ===
Title [Tagline]	Format	Material collected	Pages	Publication date	ISBN	Estimated sales (North America) [Trades]
Do Androids Dream of Electric Sheep?: Dust to Dust vol. 01	Trade paperback (TPB)	Dust To Dust #1-4	112	November 2010	1608860272; 978-1608860272	647, ranked 176th the first month
Do Androids Dream of Electric Sheep?: Dust to Dust vol. 02	TPB	Dust To Dust #5-8	96	March 2011	1608866181; 978-1608866182	621, ranked 164th the first month
