= Do Androids Dream of Electric Sheep? =

1968 science fiction novel by Philip K. Dick

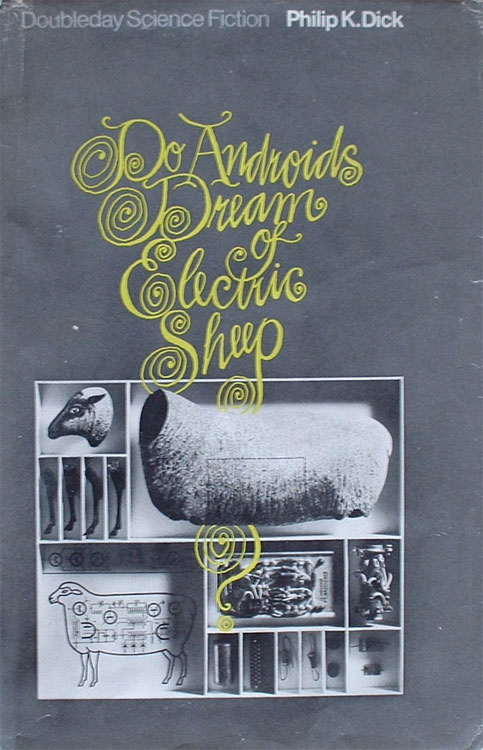
- Cover of first hardback edition
- Author: Philip K. Dick
- Language: English
- Genre: Post-apocalyptic fiction; cyberpunk; science fiction; dystopia
- Publisher: Doubleday
- Publication date: 1968
- Publication place: United States
- Media type: Print (hardback & paperback)
- Pages: 210
- OCLC: 34818133
- Followed by: The Edge of Human

Do Androids Dream of Electric Sheep? (retrospectively titled Blade Runner: Do Androids Dream of Electric Sheep? in some later printings) is a 1968 dystopian science fiction novel by American writer Philip K. Dick. It is set in a post-apocalyptic San Francisco, where Earth's life has been greatly damaged by a nuclear global war. The main plot follows Rick Deckard, a bounty hunter who has to "retire" (a euphemism for kill) six escaped Nexus-6 model androids, while a secondary plot follows John Isidore, a man of low IQ who aids the fugitive androids.

The book served as the basis for the 1982 film Blade Runner, its 2017 sequel Blade Runner 2049, and numerous other adaptations and spin-offs in other media.

== Plot ==
In 1992, (Note: 2021 in later editions.) after a global war has rendered Earth's atmosphere highly radioactive, most animal species are now endangered or extinct. As a result, owning real animals has become a fashionable and expensive status symbol, while poor people can only afford realistic electric imitations of animals. Also, due to the radiation, people are encouraged to move to off-world colonies with the incentive of free androids: biologically engineered servants so similar in appearance to humans that only an empathy test or a bone marrow analysis can confirm their identities.

Rick Deckard, a bounty hunter for the San Francisco Police Department, is assigned to "retire" (kill) six defiant and violent androids of the new Nexus-6 model which have recently escaped from Mars and traveled to Earth. Deckard hopes this mission will earn him enough money to buy a live animal to replace his lone electric sheep, which would comfort his depressed wife, Iran. First, Deckard visits the Seattle headquarters of the Rosen Association, which makes the androids, to confirm the accuracy of the empathy test on the new model. For business reasons, Rosen wishes to discredit the test and nearly succeeds. However, the test confirms twice that Rachael Rosen, his host in Seattle, is a Nexus-6 android, which she ultimately admits. Deckard returns to San Francisco to begin his hunt for the group of rebel androids.

Deckard meets and kills a Soviet police contact who turns out to be one of the Nexus-6 renegades in disguise. He then moves to kill his next target, an android living as an opera singer. Meeting her backstage, Deckard attempts to administer the test, but she calls the police, who arrest Deckard and detain him at a police station staffed with officers he is surprised to have never met. An official named Garland accuses Deckard himself of being an android with implanted memories. After a test conclusively proves that Deckard's work is legitimate, Garland draws a gun on Deckard and reveals that the entire station is a sham, claiming that both Deckard and Phil Resch, the station's resident bounty hunter, are also androids. Resch, unaware of Garland's revelation, shoots Garland in the head, escaping with Deckard back to the opera singer, whom Resch murders in cold blood. Desperate to know the truth, Resch asks Deckard to administer the empathy test on him. The test indicates Resch has sociopathic tendencies but confirms he is human. Deckard then tests himself, confirming that he is also human but has a sense of empathy for certain androids.

Having killed three androids in a day, Deckard is now able to buy his wife Iran an authentic Nubian goat. His next target is an abandoned apartment building where the three remaining android fugitives are assumed to be hiding. Deckard suddenly experiences hallucinations of a man named Mercer, the main martyr-like character in a popular religious movement who is depicted as being continuously assailed by falling rocks. The vision of Mercer tells Deckard to proceed, despite the immorality of the mission. Deckard calls on Rachael Rosen since her knowledge of android psychology may aid his investigation. Rachael declines to help, but reluctantly agrees to meet Deckard at a hotel in exchange for him abandoning the case. At the hotel, she reveals that one of the fugitive androids is the same model as her, meaning that he will have to kill an android that looks like her. Despite having initial doubts about Rachael, Deckard has sex with her, after which they confess their love for one another. Rachael reveals she has slept with many bounty hunters, having been programmed to do so in order to dissuade them from their missions. Deckard threatens to kill her but ultimately holds back and leaves for the abandoned apartment building.

The three remaining android fugitives plan to outwit Deckard. The building's only other inhabitant, John R. Isidore, a radioactively damaged and intellectually below-average human, attempts to befriend them. He is shocked when they callously torture and mutilate a rare spider he discovers. Deckard enters the building, experiencing strange visions again, warning him of an ambush. When the androids attack him first, Deckard is legally justified in killing all three without testing them beforehand. Isidore is devastated and Deckard is rewarded for a record number of Nexus-6 kills in a day. Returning home, Deckard finds Iran grieving because, while he was away, Rachael stopped by their apartment and killed their goat.

Deckard travels to an uninhabited, obliterated region near the border with Oregon to reflect. He climbs a hill and is hit by falling rocks, realizing this is an experience eerily similar to the plight of the prophet Mercer. He stumbles upon a toad (an animal thought to be extinct) but, when he returns home with it, he is crestfallen when Iran discovers it is merely a robot. As he goes to sleep, she prepares to care for the electric toad anyway.

== Influence and inspiration ==
Dick intentionally imitates noir fiction styles of scene delivery, a hard-boiled investigator dealing coldly with a brutal world full of corruption and stupidity. Another influence on Dick was author Theodore Sturgeon, writer of More Than Human, a surrealistic story of humanity broken into different tiers, one controlling another through telepathic means. A few years after the publication of Do Androids Dream of Electric Sheep?, the author spoke about man's animate creations in a 1972 speech: "The Android and the Human":

Our environment – and I mean our man-made world of machines, artificial constructs, computers, electronic systems, interlinking homeostatic components – all of this is in fact beginning more and more to possess what the earnest psychologists fear the primitive sees in his environment: animation. In a very real sense our environment is becoming alive, or at least quasi-alive, and in ways specifically and fundamentally analogous to ourselves... Rather than learning about ourselves by studying our constructs, perhaps we should make the attempt to comprehend what our constructs are up to by looking into what we ourselves are up to.

In the novel, the android antagonists are indeed more human than the human protagonist, intentionally. They are a mirror held up to human action, contrasted with a culture losing its own humanity.

=== Influence ===
Do Androids Dream of Electric Sheep? influenced generations of science fiction writers, becoming a founding document of the new wave science fiction movement as well as a basic model for its cyberpunk heirs. It influenced other genres such as sci-fi-based metal from artists including Rob Zombie and Powerman 5000.

=== Adaptations ===
Hampton Fancher and David Peoples wrote a loose cinematic adaptation that became the film Blade Runner, released in 1982, featuring several of the novel's characters. It was directed by Ridley Scott. Following the international success of the film, the title Blade Runner was adopted for some later editions of the novel, although the term itself was not used in the original. This movie led to a sequel in 2017 entitled Blade Runner 2049 which retains many themes of the novel.

As part of their Dangerous Visions dystopia series in 2014, BBC Radio 4 broadcast a two-part adaptation of the novel. It was produced and directed by Sasha Yevtushenko from an adaptation by Jonathan Holloway. It stars James Purefoy as Rick Deckard and Jessica Raine as Rachael Rosen. The episodes were originally broadcast on Sunday 15 June and 22 June 2014.

The novel has been released in audiobook form at least twice. A version was released in 1994 that featured Matthew Modine and Calista Flockhart.

A new audiobook version was released in 2007 by Random House Audio to coincide with the release of Blade Runner: The Final Cut. This version, read by Scott Brick, is unabridged and runs approximately 9.5 hours over eight CDs. This version is a tie-in, using the Blade Runner: The Final Cut film poster and Blade Runner title.

A stage adaptation of the book, written by Edward Einhorn, ran from November 18 to December 10, 2010, at the 3LD Art & Technology Center in New York and made its West Coast Premiere on September 13, 2013, playing until October 10 at the Sacred Fools Theater Company in Los Angeles.

BOOM! Studios published a 24-issue comic book limited series based on Do Androids Dream of Electric Sheep? containing the full text of the novel and illustrated by artist Tony Parker. The comic garnered a nomination for "Best New Series" from the 2010 Eisner Awards. In May 2010, BOOM! Studios began serializing an eight-issue prequel subtitled Dust To Dust, written by Chris Roberson and drawn by Robert Adler. The story takes place in the days immediately after World War Terminus.

In 2025, Sevan Kirder's Thalassor released a concept album called empathy.exe, based on Do Androids Dream of Electric Sheep?. In Limbus Company, the Abnormality Electric Dreaming Sheep is based on Do Androids Dream of Electric Sheep?.

== Sequels ==
Three novels intended as sequels to both Do Androids Dream of Electric Sheep? and Blade Runner have been published:

- Blade Runner 2: The Edge of Human (1995)
- Blade Runner 3: Replicant Night (1996)
- Blade Runner 4: Eye and Talon (2000)

These official and authorized sequels were written by Dick's friend K. W. Jeter. They continue the story of Rick Deckard and attempt to reconcile many of the differences between the novel and the 1982 film.

== Critical reception ==
Critical reception of Do Androids Dream of Electric Sheep? has been overshadowed by the popularity of its 1982 film adaptation, Blade Runner. Of those critics who focus on the novel, several nest it predominantly in the history of Philip K. Dick's body of work. In particular, Dick's 1972 speech "The Human and the Android" is cited in this connection. Jill Galvan calls attention to the correspondence between Dick's portrayal of the narrative's dystopian, polluted, man-made setting and the description Dick gives in his speech of the increasingly artificial and potentially sentient or "quasi-alive" environment of his present. Summarizing the essential point of Dick's speech, Galvan argues, "[o]nly by recognizing how [technology] has encroached upon our understanding of 'life' can we come to full terms with the technologies we have produced" (414). As a "bildungsroman of the cybernetic age", Galvan maintains, Do Androids Dream of Electric Sheep? follows one person's gradual acceptance of the new reality. Christopher Palmer emphasizes Dick's speech to bring to attention the increasingly dangerous risk of humans becoming "mechanical". "Androids threaten reduction of what makes life valuable, yet promise expansion or redefinition of it, and so do aliens and gods". Gregg Rickman cites another, earlier, and lesser-known Dick novel that also deals with androids, We Can Build You, asserting that Do Androids Dream of Electric Sheep? can be read as a sequel.

John Nubbin reviewed Do Androids Dream of Electric Sheep? for Different Worlds magazine and stated that "In the future, the only way to tell androids from humans is through a delicate battery of tests, ones which examine the moral conscience of the subject. Those tested in tune with nature, and sensitive to it, will pass as human; those who aren't, won't. The problem is, with the differences between Dick's future and our present, most people today wouldn't pass the test. The questions the readers themselves will fail are interesting indicators of just how civilized we all are, and just how bizarre a sense of humor the author had."

In a departure from the tendency among most critics to examine the novel in relation to Dick's other texts, Klaus Benesch examined Do Androids Dream of Electric Sheep? primarily in connection with Jacques Lacan's essay on the mirror stage. There, Lacan claims that the formation and reassurance of the self depends on the construction of an Other through imagery, beginning with a double as seen in the mirror. The androids, Benesch argues, perform a doubling function similar to the mirror image of the self, but they do this on a social, not individual, scale. Therefore, human anxiety about androids expresses uncertainty about human identity and society. Benesch draws on Kathleen Woodward's emphasis on the body to illustrate the shape of human anxiety about an android Other. Woodward asserts that the debate over distinctions between human and machine usually fails to acknowledge the presence of the body. "If machines are invariably contrived as technological prostheses that are designed to amplify the physical faculties of the body, they are also built, according to this logic, to outdo, to surpass the human in the sphere of physicality altogether".

Sherryl Vint emphasizes the importance of animals for the novel's exploration of the alienation of humans from their authentic being. In wrestling with his role as a bounty hunter who is supposedly defending society from those who lack empathy, Deckard comes to realize the artificiality of the distinctions that have been used in American culture to exclude animals and "animalized" humans from ethical consideration. "The central role of animals in Do Androids Dream of Electric Sheep? and the issues of species being that they raise show the need to struggle for a different way of being in the world. This way resists commodification in our relations with one another and with nature to produce a better future, one in which humans might be fully human once again by repairing our social relations with animals and nature."

== Awards and honors ==
- 1968 – Nebula Award nominee
- 1998 – Locus Poll Award, All-Time Best SF Novel before 1990 (Place: 51)

== See also ==
- Biorobotics
