= Rick Deckard =

Character from Blade Runner

- Blade Runner character
- Harrison Ford as Rick Deckard in the 1982 film
- First appearance: Do Androids Dream of Electric Sheep? (1968)
- Last appearance: Blade Runner 2049 (2017)
- Created by: Philip K. Dick
- Portrayed by: Harrison Ford
- Voiced by: James Purefoy

In-universe information
- Gender: Male
- Occupation: Police officer / bounty hunter / Blade Runner
- Affiliation: San Francisco Police Department (book); Los Angeles Police Department (film)
- Family: Ana Stelline (daughter, with Rachael)
- Spouse: Iran Deckard (book)
- Significant others: Rachael
- Homeworld: Earth

Richard Deckard is a character and the main protagonist of Philip K. Dick's 1968 novel Do Androids Dream of Electric Sheep?. Harrison Ford portrayed the character in the 1982 film adaptation, Blade Runner, and reprised his role in the 2017 sequel, Blade Runner 2049. James Purefoy voiced the character in the 2014 BBC Radio 4 adaptation.

== Original novel ==
Rick Deckard is a bounty hunter who becomes a specialist plainclothes police officer with the San Francisco Police Department in the early 21st century, responsible for killing androids that escape from off-world colonies. He begins the story as a selfish, self-involved cop who seemingly sees no value in android life, but his experiences cause him to develop empathy toward androids and all living things.

Deckard is married to Iran, one of the more empathetic characters in the novel. She descends into a depression over the state of humanity, and is able to find the empathy necessary to care for an electric toad at the end of the novel.

== Adaptation ==
=== Blade Runner ===
Harrison Ford portrayed Deckard in the 1982 film. In the film, the bounty hunters are replaced by special police personnel called "Blade Runners", and the androids are called "replicants", terms not used in the original novel. The novel depicts Deckard as an obsequious and officious underling who is human and has a wife, but because of the many versions of the film and the script, the backstory of the movie version of Deckard becomes unclear. Whether Deckard is a human or replicant and therefore even has a past is left ambiguous. The voice-over in the theatrical release indicates Deckard is divorced, as it mentions an ex-wife. However, the voice-over has been removed from subsequent versions and so this detail is not mentioned. If the viewer takes the perspective that Deckard is a replicant then the "ex-wife" only becomes an implanted memory.

=== Blade Runner 2049 ===
Ford reprised the role for the sequel, portraying an older Deckard who is hiding in the radioactive ruins of Las Vegas, violently resisting intrusion. Prior to the events of the film, Deckard's replicant lover Rachael became pregnant with his child, but died in childbirth. Deckard was forced to leave the child, a girl, with a replicant freedom movement and scrambled the child's birth records to protect her before disappearing. The pursuit of the child by different groups is the main driving force of the plot. At the end of the film, Deckard finally meets his daughter Ana Stelline, a scientist who designs memories for replicants, through the help of a Nexus-9 Replicant, KD6-3.7.

== Analysis ==
According to M. Blake Wilson, Deckard, the most famous of Dick's criminal justice professionals, is "one of the most humanized human cops in literature", showing a wide range of emotions and empathy, something that was further explored in the movie sequel (Blade Runner 2049) through the character of K.

== Ambiguous nature ==
The Director's Cut and The Final Cut include a sequence in which Deckard daydreams about a unicorn; in the final scene, he finds an origami unicorn on the floor outside his apartment, left there by Gaff, suggesting that Gaff knows about Deckard's dream in the same manner that Deckard knows about Rachael's implanted memories. Scott confirmed this interpretation was his intent. However, while memory implantation for replicants is established elsewhere in the movie, it is unclear whether daydreams work in the same way.

The movie contains other evidence and hints that Deckard is a replicant, though none proves he is inhuman:

- Deckard's apartment is full of photographs, none of them recent or in color. Replicants have a taste for photographs because it provides a tie to a non-existent past.
- Rachael asks, "You know that Voight-Kampff test of yours? Did you ever take that test yourself? Deckard?" By the time she says his name, Rachael finds that she had not received an answer because the injured, exhausted Deckard has fallen asleep.
- His fellow detective Gaff shows no sympathy for Deckard.
- After Roy expires, Gaff tells Deckard, "You've done a man's job, sir!"
- Deckard's eyes glow briefly in one scene, which was used in the film to subtly suggest his replicant identity. However, Ford denies this was an intentional effect; he may have caught some of the light intended to fall on Sean Young's eyes.

The purpose of this story as I saw it was that in his job of hunting and killing these replicants, Deckard becomes progressively dehumanized. At the same time, the replicants are being perceived as becoming more human. Finally, Deckard must question what he is doing, and really what is the essential difference between him and them? And, to take it one step further, who is he if there is no real difference?

— Philip K. Dick

Philip K. Dick wrote the character Deckard as a human in the original novel in order to explore the increasing similarity of humans and replicants; for example, the book states explicitly that Deckard passed the Voight-Kampff test. Screenwriter Hampton Fancher has said that he wrote the character as a human, but wanted the film to suggest the possibility that he may be a replicant. When asked, "Is Deckard a replicant?", Fancher replied, "No. It wasn't like I had a tricky idea about Deckard that way." During a discussion panel with Scott to discuss Blade Runner: The Final Cut, Fancher again stated that he believes Deckard is human (Scott's "idea is too complex"), but also repeated that he prefers the film to remain ambiguous.

Harrison Ford had stated over the years that he considered Deckard to be human. "That was the main area of contention between Ridley and myself at the time," Ford told an interviewer during a BBC One Hollywood Greats segment. "I thought the audience deserved one human being on screen that they could establish an emotional relationship with. I thought I had won Ridley's agreement to that, but in fact I think he had a little reservation about that. I think he really wanted to have it both ways." Scott suggests that Ford may have since changed his view, although Blade Runner 2049 director Denis Villeneuve claimed that Ford and Scott argue about the issue to this day. Other people involved in the movie's production who have expressed the view that Deckard is human include: David Snyder (art director), M. Emmet Walsh (who portrayed Bryant) and Rutger Hauer (who portrayed Roy Batty).

In a 2023 interview, Ford stated that he "always knew" that Deckard was a replicant, but wanted to "push back against it", adding that a replicant (or at least, Deckard) would want to believe that they are human.

Ridley Scott stated in several interviews that he considers Deckard to be a replicant. Syd Mead, the film's visual futurist, agreed with Scott that Deckard is a replicant. Douglas Trumbull, the film's visual effects supervisor, stated that he does not know Deckard's true nature and that the issue is an enigma. Similarly, Villeneuve also noted that in 2049, Deckard "is unsure, as we are, of what his identity is".

== Name ==
His name has been interpreted by many as a reference to the Renaissance philosopher René Descartes. In the context of the philosophy of mind, dualism is most closely associated with Descartes, who argued that the mind is a non-material and therefore non-spatial substance distinct from the physical body. He identified the mind with consciousness and self-awareness, while treating the brain as a physical organ responsible for intellectual processes. Through this distinction, Descartes formulated the mind–body problem in a form that has remained central to philosophical debates about the relationship between mind and body to this day. This issue also constitutes one of the central themes of Dick’s novel.
