= Orion Ben =

Actor

- Occupation: Actress
- Years active: 2012–present

Orion Ben is a British actress of both Romanian and Moroccan descent, best known for portraying Varde in the BBC Four series Detectorists and her appearances in the second Blade Runner 2049 prequel short film 2048: Nowhere to Run and Call the Midwife.

== Early life ==
Ben was born to a Romanian mother and a Moroccan French father. In 2012, Ben graduated from Oxford School of Drama with a Diploma in Professional Acting.

== Acting career ==
Starting in 2013, Ben had guest appearances on television series including the Channel 4 series Skins Pure, the BBC TV series Doctors and Stan Lee's Sky1 series Stan Lee's Lucky Man.

Ben also played the guest lead Leah Moss, a young pregnant girl who is caring for her elderly agoraphobic mother in the fourth episode of the third series of the BBC medical period drama Call the Midwife, which aired on 9 February 2014.

Ben starred as the lead in two horror films, Breathe and Agravoy, for which she was awarded the second place in the best actress category at the Helios film festival.

Ben plays the recurring role of Varde in the BBC Four comedy series Detectorists.

In 2017, Ben played the mother in the Blade Runner 2049 short film 2048: Nowhere to Run; directed by Luke Scott, the film follows Sapper Morton as he protects a mother (Ben) and daughter from thugs.

In 2022, Ben appeared as Pistis in episode 4 ‘Barbarians at the Gate’ of the Apple TV+ series Foundation.

== Filmography ==
Films and television

| Year | Title | Role | Notes |
|---|---|---|---|
| 2013 | Skins | Nava | Episode: "Skins Pure" |
| 2013 | Breathe | May (Lead) | Short film |
| 2014 | Call the Midwife | Leah Moss | |
| 2015 | Agravoy | Women (Lead) | Short Film |
| 2015 | Doctors | Jenny Underhill | Episode: "By the Lake" |
| 2017 | Stan Lee's Lucky Man | Stark House Assistant | Season 2 |
| 2017 | Doctors | Amena Malouf | Tarragon |
| 2017 | 2048: Nowhere to Run | Mother | |
| 2021 | Foundation | Pistis | Barbarians at the Gate |
| 2014–2022 | Detectorists | Varde | Recurring role |

Theatre

| Year | Title | Notes |
|---|---|---|
| 2012 | Three Sisters | Young Vic Theatre |
