= List of accolades received by Blade Runner 2049 =

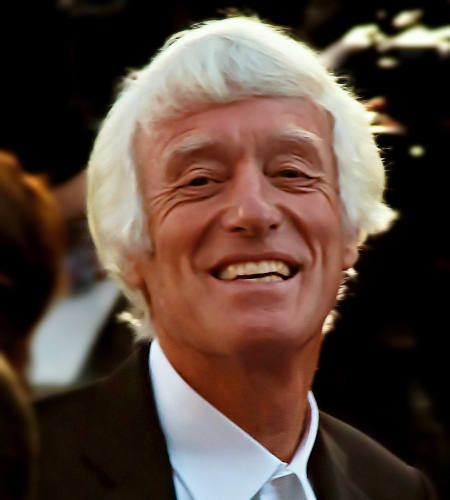
- Roger Deakins' cinematography received wide critical acclaim, and received several awards for his work in the film, including an Academy Award, the first of his career after 13 previous nominations.
Accolades
Award	Won	Nominated
Academy Awards	2	5
American Society of Cinematographers	1	1
Art Directors Guild	1	1
Austin Film Critics Association	1	3
British Academy Film Awards	2	8
Chicago Film Critics Association	2	4
Critics' Choice Awards	1	7
Dallas-Fort Worth Film Critics Association	0	1
Detroit Film Critics Society	0	1
Dublin Film Critics Circle	1	5
Eddie Awards	0	1
Evening Standard British Film Awards	0	1
Florida Film Critics Circle	4	4
Golden Reel Awards	1	3
Golden Trailer Awards	1	1
Hollywood Film Awards	3	3
Hollywood Music in Media Awards	0	1
Houston Film Critics Society	2	3
IGN Awards	4	5
IndieWire Critics Poll	1	1
London Film Critics' Circle	1	1
Los Angeles Film Critics Association	1	2
Make-Up Artists and Hair Stylists Guild	0	2
National Society of Film Critics	1	1
Online Film Critics Society	1	1
San Francisco Film Critics Circle	1	4
Satellite Awards	2	4
Saturn Awards	1	9
Seattle Film Critics Society	2	8
St. Louis Film Critics Association	2	5
Teen Choice Awards	0	2
Visual Effects Society Awards	2	7
Washington D.C. Area Film Critics Association	3	5
- Total number of awards and nominations (Note: Certain award groups do not award only one winner, as they may recognize several recipients, and include runners-up. Since this is a specific recognition and is different from losing an award, runner-up mentions are considered wins in the awards tally.) (Note: Organizations without a Wikipedia page are not included in list of accolades.)
Totals	44	108	
- References

Blade Runner 2049 is a 2017 American neo-noir science fiction film directed by Denis Villeneuve and written by Hampton Fancher and Michael Green. A sequel to the 1982 film Blade Runner, the film stars Ryan Gosling and Harrison Ford, with Ana de Armas, Sylvia Hoeks, Robin Wright, Mackenzie Davis, Carla Juri, Lennie James, Dave Bautista, and Jared Leto in supporting roles. Ford and Edward James Olmos reprise their roles from the original film. Set thirty years after the first film, Gosling plays K, a replicant blade runner who uncovers a secret that threatens to instigate a war between humans and replicants. The film was released on October 6, 2017, in the United States and has grossed $267 million worldwide.

Blade Runner 2049 received numerous awards and nominations. At the 90th Academy Awards, it was nominated for five awards, and won two: Best Cinematography and Best Visual Effects. At the 71st British Academy Film Awards, it received eight nominations, including Best Director, and won for Best Cinematography and Best Special Visual Effects. At the 23rd Critics' Choice Awards, it was nominated for seven awards, winning for Best Cinematography.

== Accolades ==
Award	Date of ceremony	Category	Recipient(s)	Result	Ref.
IndieWire Critic's Poll	December 19, 2016	Most Anticipated of 2017	Blade Runner 2049	Won	
Golden Trailer Awards	June 6, 2017	Best Teaser	Blade Runner 2049	Won	
Hollywood Film Awards	November 5, 2017	Hollywood Producer Award	Andrew A. Kosove, Broderick Johnson and Cynthia Sikes Yorkin	Won	
Hollywood Film Awards	November 5, 2017	Hollywood Cinematography Award	Roger Deakins	Won	
Hollywood Film Awards	November 5, 2017	Hollywood Production Design Award	Dennis Gassner	Won	
Hollywood Music in Media Awards	November 16, 2017	Best Original Score – Sci-Fi/Fantasy/Horror Film	Hans Zimmer and Benjamin Wallfisch	Nominated	
Detroit Film Critics Society	December 7, 2017	Best Use of Music	Blade Runner 2049	Nominated	
Washington D.C. Area Film Critics Association	December 8, 2017	Best Adapted Screenplay	Michael Green and Hampton Fancher	Nominated	
Washington D.C. Area Film Critics Association	December 8, 2017	Best Production Design	Dennis Gassner and Alessandra Querzola	Won	
Washington D.C. Area Film Critics Association	December 8, 2017	Best Cinematography	Roger Deakins	Won	
Washington D.C. Area Film Critics Association	December 8, 2017	Best Editing	Joe Walker	Nominated	
Washington D.C. Area Film Critics Association	December 8, 2017	Best Original Score	Hans Zimmer and Benjamin Wallfisch	Won	
San Francisco Film Critics Circle	December 10, 2017	Best Cinematography	Roger Deakins	Won	
San Francisco Film Critics Circle	December 10, 2017	Best Production Design	Dennis Gassner	Nominated	
San Francisco Film Critics Circle	December 10, 2017	Best Original Score	Hans Zimmer and Benjamin Wallfisch	Nominated	
San Francisco Film Critics Circle	December 10, 2017	Best Film Editing	Joe Walker	Nominated	
Chicago Film Critics Association	December 12, 2017	Best Adapted Screenplay	Michael Green and Hampton Fancher	Nominated	
Chicago Film Critics Association	December 12, 2017	Best Art Direction	Blade Runner 2049	Won	
Chicago Film Critics Association	December 12, 2017	Best Original Score	Hans Zimmer and Benjamin Wallfisch	Nominated	
Chicago Film Critics Association	December 12, 2017	Best Cinematography	Roger Deakins	Won	
Dallas–Fort Worth Film Critics Association	December 13, 2017	Best Cinematography	Roger Deakins	Runner-up	
Dublin Film Critics Circle	December 13, 2017	Best Film	Blade Runner 2049	4th place	
Dublin Film Critics Circle	December 13, 2017	Best Director	Denis Villeneuve	2nd place	
Dublin Film Critics Circle	December 13, 2017	Best Actor	Ryan Gosling	Runner-up	
Dublin Film Critics Circle	December 13, 2017	Best Screenplay	Michael Green and Hampton Fancher	Runner-up	
Dublin Film Critics Circle	December 13, 2017	Best Cinematography	Roger Deakins	Won	
St. Louis Film Critics Association	December 17, 2017	Best Director	Denis Villeneuve	Nominated	
St. Louis Film Critics Association	December 17, 2017	Best Cinematography	Roger Deakins	Won	
St. Louis Film Critics Association	December 17, 2017	Best Production Design	Dennis Gassner	Nominated	
St. Louis Film Critics Association	December 17, 2017	Best Visual Effects	Blade Runner 2049	Won	
St. Louis Film Critics Association	December 17, 2017	Best Score	Hans Zimmer and Benjamin Wallfisch	Nominated	
Seattle Film Critics Society	December 18, 2017	Best Picture of the Year	Blade Runner 2049	Nominated	
Seattle Film Critics Society	December 18, 2017	Best Director	Denis Villeneuve	Nominated	
Seattle Film Critics Society	December 18, 2017	Best Cinematography	Roger Deakins	Won	
Seattle Film Critics Society	December 18, 2017	Best Costume Design	Renée April	Nominated	
Seattle Film Critics Society	December 18, 2017	Best Film Editing	Joe Walker	Nominated	
Seattle Film Critics Society	December 18, 2017	Best Original Score	Hans Zimmer and Benjamin Wallfisch	Nominated	
Seattle Film Critics Society	December 18, 2017	Best Production Design	Dennis Gassner and Alessandra Querzola	Won	
Seattle Film Critics Society	December 18, 2017	Best Visual Effects	John Nelson, Paul Lambert, Richard R. Hoover and Gerd Nefzer	Nominated	
IGN's Best of 2017 Awards	December 20, 2017	Movie of the Year	Blade Runner 2049	Won	
IGN's Best of 2017 Awards	December 20, 2017	Best Sci-Fi/Fantasy Movie	Blade Runner 2049	Won	
IGN's Best of 2017 Awards	December 20, 2017	People's Choice Award for Best Sci-Fi/Fantasy Movie	Blade Runner 2049	Won	
IGN's Best of 2017 Awards	December 20, 2017	Best Director	Denis Villeneuve	Won	
IGN's Best of 2017 Awards	December 20, 2017	Best Supporting Performer in a Movie	Sylvia Hoeks	Nominated	
Florida Film Critics Circle	December 23, 2017	Best Cinematography	Blade Runner 2049	Won	
Florida Film Critics Circle	December 23, 2017	Best Visual Effects	Blade Runner 2049	Won	
Florida Film Critics Circle	December 23, 2017	Best Art Direction/Production Design	Blade Runner 2049	Won	
Florida Film Critics Circle	December 23, 2017	Best Score	Blade Runner 2049	Won	
Online Film Critics Society	December 28, 2017	Best Cinematography	Roger Deakins	Won	
Houston Film Critics Society	January 6, 2018	Best Cinematography	Roger Deakins	Won	
Houston Film Critics Society	January 6, 2018	Best Original Score	Hans Zimmer and Benjamin Wallfisch	Nominated	
Houston Film Critics Society	January 6, 2018	Best Visual Effects	Blade Runner 2049	Won	
National Society of Film Critics	January 6, 2018	Best Cinematography	Roger Deakins	Won	
Austin Film Critics Association	January 8, 2018	Best Director	Denis Villeneuve	Nominated	
Austin Film Critics Association	January 8, 2018	Best Cinematography	Roger Deakins	Won	
Austin Film Critics Association	January 8, 2018	Best Original Score	Blade Runner 2049	Nominated	
Critics' Choice Movie Awards	January 11, 2018	Best Cinematography	Roger Deakins	Won	
Critics' Choice Movie Awards	January 11, 2018	Best Production Design	Dennis Gassner and Alessandra Querzola	Nominated	
Critics' Choice Movie Awards	January 11, 2018	Best Editing	Joe Walker	Nominated	
Critics' Choice Movie Awards	January 11, 2018	Best Costume Design	Renée April	Nominated	
Critics' Choice Movie Awards	January 11, 2018	Best Visual Effects	Blade Runner 2049	Nominated	
Critics' Choice Movie Awards	January 11, 2018	Best Sci-Fi/Horror Movie	Blade Runner 2049	Nominated	
Critics' Choice Movie Awards	January 11, 2018	Best Score	Hans Zimmer and Benjamin Wallfisch	Nominated	
Los Angeles Film Critics Association Awards	January 12, 2018	Best Production Design	Dennis Gassner	Won	
Los Angeles Film Critics Association Awards	January 12, 2018	Best Cinematography	Roger Deakins	Runner-up	
Eddie Awards	January 26, 2018	Best Edited Feature Film (Dramatic)	Joe Walker	Nominated	
Art Directors Guild Awards	January 27, 2018	Fantasy Film	Dennis Gassner	Won	
London Film Critics Circle	January 28, 2018	Technical Achievement Award	Dennis Gassner	Won	
Evening Standard British Film Awards	February 8, 2018	Technical Achievement Award	Roger Deakins	Nominated	
Satellite Awards	February 10, 2018	Best Art Direction and Production Design	Blade Runner 2049	Nominated	
Satellite Awards	February 10, 2018	Best Sound	Blade Runner 2049	Nominated	
Satellite Awards	February 10, 2018	Best Visual Effects	Blade Runner 2049	Won	
Satellite Awards	February 10, 2018	Best Cinematography	Roger Deakins	Won	
Visual Effects Society Awards	February 13, 2018	Outstanding Visual Effects in a Photoreal Feature	John Nelson, Karen Murphy Mundell, Paul Lambert, Richard R. Hoover, Gerd Nefzer	Nominated	
Visual Effects Society Awards	February 13, 2018	Outstanding Animated Character in a Photoreal Feature	Axel Akkeson, Stefano Carter, Wesley Chandler, Ian Cooke-Grimes for "Rachael"	Nominated	
Visual Effects Society Awards	February 13, 2018	Outstanding Created Environment in a Photoreal Feature	Chris McLaughlin, Ryan Salcombe, Seungjin Woo, Francesco Dell'Anna for "Los Angeles"	Won	
Visual Effects Society Awards	February 13, 2018	Outstanding Created Environment in a Photoreal Feature	Didier Muanza, Thomas Gillet, Guillaume Mainville, Sylvain Lorgeau for "Trash Mesa"	Nominated	
Visual Effects Society Awards	February 13, 2018	Outstanding Created Environment in a Photoreal Feature	Eric Noel, Arnaud Saibron, Adam Goldstein, Pascal Clement for "Vegas"	Nominated	
Visual Effects Society Awards	February 13, 2018	Outstanding Model in a Photoreal or Animated Project	Alex Funke, Steven Saunders, Joaquin Loyzaga, Chris Menges for "LAPD Headquarters"	Won	
Visual Effects Society Awards	February 13, 2018	Outstanding Compositing in a Photoreal Feature	Tristan Myles, Miles Lauridsen, Joel Delle-Vergin, Farhad Mohasseb for "LAPD Approach and Joy Holograms"	Nominated	
American Society of Cinematographers Awards	February 17, 2018	Outstanding Achievement in Cinematography in Theatrical Releases	Roger Deakins	Won	
British Academy Film Awards	February 18, 2018	Best Director	Denis Villeneuve	Nominated	
British Academy Film Awards	February 18, 2018	Best Cinematography	Roger Deakins	Won	
British Academy Film Awards	February 18, 2018	Best Original Music	Hans Zimmer and Benjamin Wallfisch	Nominated	
British Academy Film Awards	February 18, 2018	Best Sound	Ron Bartlett, Theo Green, Doug Hemphill, Mark Mangini, and Mac Ruth	Nominated	
British Academy Film Awards	February 18, 2018	Best Production Design	Dennis Gassner and Alessandra Querzola	Nominated	
British Academy Film Awards	February 18, 2018	Best Special Visual Effects	Richard R. Hoover, Paul Lambert, Gerd Nefzer and John Nelson	Won	
British Academy Film Awards	February 18, 2018	Best Makeup and Hair	Donald Mowat and Kerry Warn	Nominated	
British Academy Film Awards	February 18, 2018	Best Editing	Joe Walker	Nominated	
Golden Reel Awards	February 18, 2018	Outstanding Achievement in Sound Editing – Music Score	Clint Bennett, Ryan Rubin and Del Spiva	Nominated	
Golden Reel Awards	February 18, 2018	Outstanding Achievement in Sound Editing – Dialogue / ADR	Mark Mangini, Byron Wilson and Michael Hertlein	Nominated	
Golden Reel Awards	February 18, 2018	Outstanding Achievement in Sound Editing – Effects / Foley	Mark Mangini, Theo Green, Chris Aud, Lee Gilmore, Greg ten Bosch, Charlie Campagna, Dave Whitehead, Eliot Connors, Ezra Dweck, Goro Koyama and Andy Malcolm	Won	
Make-Up Artists and Hair Stylists Guild	February 24, 2018	Feature Motion Picture: Best Period and/or Character Makeup	Donald Mowat, Jo-Ann Macneil and Csilla Horvath Blake	Nominated	
Make-Up Artists and Hair Stylists Guild	February 24, 2018	Feature Motion Picture: Best Period and/or Character Hair Styling	Kerry Warn, Lizzie Lawson Zeiss and Jaime Leigh Mcintosh	Nominated	
Academy Awards	March 4, 2018	Best Cinematography	Roger Deakins	Won	
Academy Awards	March 4, 2018	Best Production Design	Production Design: Dennis Gassner; Set Decoration: Alessandra Querzola	Nominated	
Academy Awards	March 4, 2018	Best Sound Editing	Mark Mangini and Theo Green	Nominated	
Academy Awards	March 4, 2018	Best Sound Mixing	Ron Bartlett, Doug Hemphill and Mac Ruth	Nominated	
Academy Awards	March 4, 2018	Best Visual Effects	John Nelson, Gerd Nefzer, Paul Lambert and Richard R. Hoover	Won	
Saturn Awards	June 27, 2018	Best Science Fiction Film	Blade Runner 2049	Won	
Saturn Awards	June 27, 2018	Best Director	Denis Villeneuve	Nominated	
Saturn Awards	June 27, 2018	Best Writing	Hampton Fancher and Michael Green	Nominated	
Saturn Awards	June 27, 2018	Best Actor	Ryan Gosling	Nominated	
Saturn Awards	June 27, 2018	Best Supporting Actor	Harrison Ford	Nominated	
Saturn Awards	June 27, 2018	Best Supporting Actress	Ana de Armas	Nominated	
Saturn Awards	June 27, 2018	Best Production Design	Dennis Gassner	Nominated	
Saturn Awards	June 27, 2018	Best Make-up	Donald Mowat	Nominated	
Saturn Awards	June 27, 2018	Best Film Special / Visual Effects	John Nelson, Paul Lambert, Richard R. Hoover and Gerd Nefzer	Nominated	
Teen Choice Awards	August 12, 2018	Choice Sci-Fi Movie	Blade Runner 2049	Nominated	
Teen Choice Awards	August 12, 2018	Choice Sci-Fi Movie Actor	Ryan Gosling	Nominated	
