= 2048 =

2048 may refer to:

- AD 2048, a year in the 2040s
- 2048 (number)
- 2048 (video game), a puzzle game
- 2048: Nowhere to Run, a 2017 American science-fiction film
