= 2036: Nexus Dawn =

2017 short film prologue to Blade Runner 2049 directed by Luke Scott

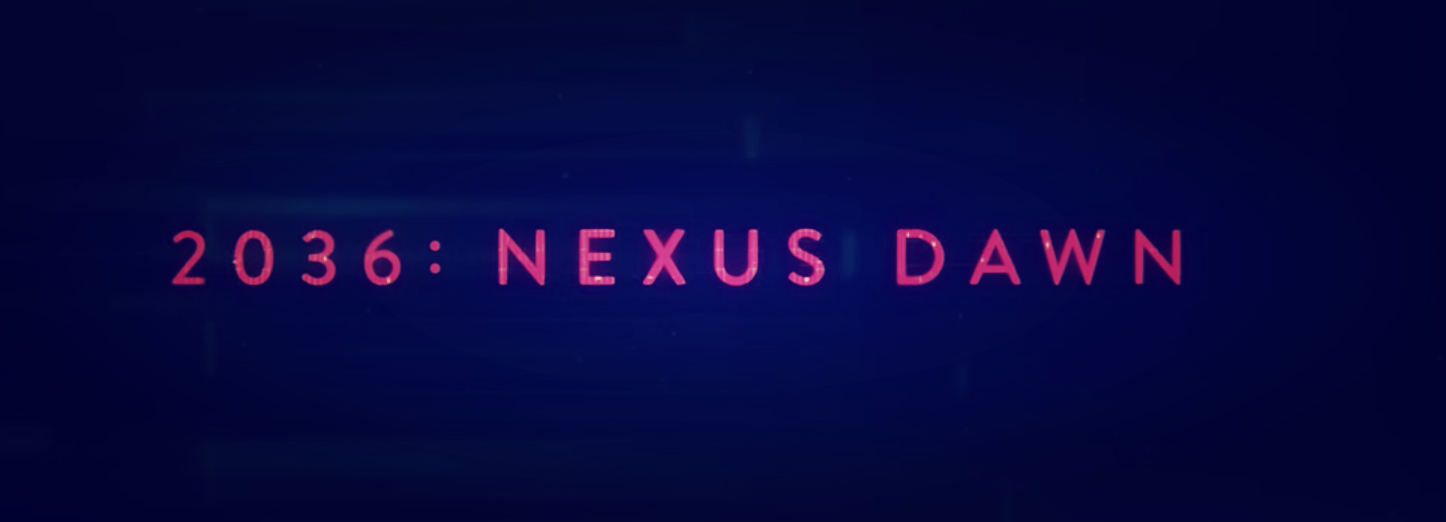
- Directed by: Luke Scott
- Screenplay by: Hampton Fancher; Michael Green
- Starring: Jared Leto; Benedict Wong
- Music by: Blitz//Berlin
- Production companies: Alcon Entertainment; Columbia Pictures; Thunderbird Entertainment; Scott Free Productions
- Distributed by: Warner Bros. Pictures (North America); Sony Pictures Releasing International (International)
- Release date: August 30, 2017
- Running time: 6 minutes
- Country: United States
- Language: English

2036: Nexus Dawn (known in Chinese and Taiwanese territories as 2036: Clone Era, 2036: Chain Dawn, or 2036: Copy of the Times; alternatively known as Blade Runner 2036) is a 2017 American short film acting as a prequel to the feature film Blade Runner 2049. It is one of three such prequels, alongside Blade Runner Black Out 2022 and 2048: Nowhere to Run. The short was released on August 30, 2017, approximately five weeks before the release of the feature film, and features Jared Leto as Blade Runner 2049 character Niander Wallace, alongside Benedict Wong. The film was written by Hampton Fancher and Michael Green, who also wrote the feature film, and directed by Luke Scott, whose father Ridley Scott directed the original Blade Runner and is executive producer on the sequel Blade Runner 2049.

The film takes place in Los Angeles in 2036, 13 years before the events of Blade Runner 2049. Here, Wallace meets with "lawmakers" and attempts to convince them to allow his new line of replicants to enter production.

== Plot ==
Niander Wallace is called to a hearing about his desire to manufacture a new generation of replicants. Wallace is warned that what he is doing is illegal and not open to debate, which Wallace questions saying they are debating it. Wallace points out that Earth's ecosystem is collapsing and the only thing that can sustain the human race is cheap labor provided by replicants. He also claims the new replicants are not dangerous to humans, but the lawmakers remain unconvinced. To prove this, he orders his replicant assistant, a newly developed Nexus-9, to purposely cut himself and then decide between Wallace's life and his own. The replicant then cuts his own throat, shocking the lawmakers. Wallace once again asks them if they are willing to authorize the production of new replicants.

=== Chinese prologue ===
The Chinese version of the film features a text-based prologue. The text explains that replicant production had been banned after "The Blackout" in 2022, leading to the bankruptcy of the Tyrell Corporation. Earth's ecosystem has been on the brink of collapse since the mid-2020s. Niander Wallace, the blind CEO of the Wallace Corporation, is explained to have acquired the Tyrell Corporation and begun to develop a new generation of replicants to serve as slaves to help rebuild the Earth's environment. This prologue also appears before the Chinese version of the Blade Runner short film 2048: Nowhere to Run.

== Cast ==
- Jared Leto as Niander Wallace
- Benedict Wong as Lawmaker
- Ned Dennehy as Lawmaker No. 2
- Ade Sapara as Lawmaker No. 3
- Ania Marson as lawmaker No. 4
- Set Sjöstrand as Nexus-9 replicant

== Release ==
On August 29, 2017, it was announced that Denis Villeneuve had selected three filmmakers to direct short films exploring incidents that occurred between the events of Blade Runner and Blade Runner 2049. The first, 2036: Nexus Dawn, is directed by Luke Scott, and follows Niander Wallace as he presents a new Nexus-9 replicant to lawmakers in an attempt to have a prohibition on replicants lifted. The short film also stars Benedict Wong as one of the lawmakers.

== Reception ==
2036: Nexus Dawn was met with appreciation for acknowledging Ridley Scott's son.

== See also ==
- Artificial intelligence
- List of adaptations of works by Philip K. Dick
