= Morgan (2016 film) =

2016 science fiction horror film by Luke Scott

- Theatrical release poster
- Directed by: Luke Scott
- Written by: Seth Owen
- Produced by: Ridley Scott; Michael Schaefer; Mark Huffam
- Starring: Kate Mara; Anya Taylor-Joy; Toby Jones; Rose Leslie; Boyd Holbrook; Michelle Yeoh; Jennifer Jason Leigh; Paul Giamatti
- Cinematography: Mark Patten
- Edited by: Laura Jennings
- Music by: Max Richter
- Production company: Scott Free Productions
- Distributed by: 20th Century Fox
- Release date: September 2, 2016
- Running time: 92 minutes
- Countries: United Kingdom; United States
- Language: English
- Budget: $8 million
- Box office: $8.8 million

Morgan is a 2016 science fiction horror film directed by Luke Scott, in his directorial debut, and written by Seth Owen. The film features an ensemble cast, including Kate Mara, Anya Taylor-Joy, Toby Jones, Rose Leslie, Boyd Holbrook, Michelle Yeoh, Jennifer Jason Leigh, and Paul Giamatti.

Filming began May 26, 2015, in Northern Ireland. The film was released September 2, 2016, by 20th Century Fox.

== Plot ==
Lee Weathers is a "risk-management specialist" for genetic-engineering company SynSect. She arrives at a rural site hosting its L-9 project, an artificial being with nanotechnology-infused synthetic DNA named Morgan. The "hybrid biological organism with the capacity for autonomous decision making and sophisticated emotional responses" is smarter than humans and has matured quickly, walking and talking within a month and already physically equivalent to a young teenage girl despite being born only five years before.

The cold and precise Weathers, who insists on calling Morgan "it", is at the site to assess the project while a psychologist evaluates Morgan, who has used a pen to stab Dr. Kathy Grieff in the eye. Over dinner with the team of eight scientists, Weathers and project leaders Dr. Lui Cheng and Dr. Simon Ziegler discuss an incident in Helsinki involving Cheng in which 21 SynSect researchers were killed in an hour by "crude prototypes".

Lee learns that Morgan attacked Grieff when she was prohibited from leaving her room, a glass cell, after killing a deer impaled on a tree branch, out of compassion for its suffering, while exploring outside. The scientists have reared Morgan from birth following two failed attempts, and most consider her to be their child; Grieff defends Morgan to Weathers despite her injury, and Dr. Amy Menser wants to resume taking her on outings. Menser promises to take Morgan to a nearby lake that she describes as wonderful; the behavioral therapist understands that Morgan is, despite her intellect and physical appearance and abilities, emotionally strange. Although Morgan considers Cheng to be her "mother", the scientist is pessimistic about the project; she admits to Weathers that she ended the outings as it is cruel to expose Morgan to a world she cannot be allowed to enter.

Psychologist and artificial intelligence expert Dr. Alan Shapiro arrives to assess Morgan and quickly defies the scientists' requests to stay outside Morgan's room for the assessment. When Shapiro aggressively taunts Morgan as part of his evaluation, she looks at her hand, becomes angry and spontaneously kills him. Weathers tranquilizes Morgan after a brief escape, and decides that she is too unpredictable and must be terminated. The scientists refuse to kill Morgan; before Weathers can do so, they shoot her with a tranquilizer dart and imprison her in the cell in which Morgan was held. The scientists plan to escape with Morgan, but after waking, Morgan, believing they have betrayed her starts a killing spree. She kills Darren with a lethal injection, shoots Ted in the chest and the head, and beats Brenda to death with a pistol. Ziegler, unaware of the murders, commits suicide after realizing his life's work turned into a failure.

In the scientists' house, Cheng records an apology for the failure of the project. The scientists tried to make Morgan "more human" than the previous attempts so she could exceed her design as a combat weapon, but found that the result was harder to control. Morgan arrives at the house and kills a confused Grieff. After conversing with her "mother" in Chinese, Morgan then manually suffocates Cheng. Weathers escapes the cell and briefly fights Morgan, able to match her. Morgan flees with the terrified Menser, who Morgan says is the only scientist who was a real friend to her.

Weathers and nutritionist Skip Vronsky follow the pair. Vronsky deduces that Morgan has forced Menser to take her to the lake, which entrances Morgan. She and Weathers fight again, seemingly matched in strength and speed. Morgan knocks down Weathers, who is impaled on the branch of a fallen tree. Morgan flees again and meets with Menser at the pier but Weathers, having survived the impaling, appears and forcibly drowns her. She then shoots Menser and Vronsky, apologizing first, before leaving the scene.

Weathers's superior at SynSect and another executive discuss the incident. They decide that it proves that the company's earlier L-4 project is superior. When the executive asks about Weathers, the superior says she is perfect, revealing that Weathers is actually the L-4 prototype, lacking much of the emotional development Morgan had. While sitting in a diner, Weathers looks at her hands in the same way Morgan did.

== Cast ==
- Kate Mara as Lee Weathers
- Anya Taylor-Joy as Morgan
  - Amybeth McNulty as young Morgan
- Toby Jones as Dr. Simon Ziegler
- Rose Leslie as Dr. Amy Menser
- Boyd Holbrook as Skip Vronsky
- Michelle Yeoh as Dr. Lui Cheng
- Jennifer Jason Leigh as Dr. Kathy Grieff
- Paul Giamatti as Dr. Alan Shapiro
- Michael Yare as Ted Brenner
- Chris Sullivan as Dr. Darren Finch
- Vinette Robinson as Dr. Brenda Finch
- Crispian Belfrage as Charles Grimes
- Luke Whoriskey as Jimmy
- Jonathan Aris as David Chance
- Brian Cox as Jim Bryce

== Production ==
The film's script was placed on the 2014 Black List of most-liked unproduced screenplays. It was picked up by Ridley Scott's Scott Free Productions, who were set to produce with 20th Century Fox attached as financier and distributor. On March 10, 2015, Kate Mara was announced as having been cast in the lead role, corporate risk-management consultant Lee Weathers; Dakota Johnson, Claire Holt, Lena Dunham and Carice van Houten were also considered, while Luke Scott, son of Ridley, was set to make his directing debut, with Ridley Scott producing, along with Michael Schaefer and Elishia Holmes. Anya Taylor-Joy joined the cast in the title role of Morgan, the genetically engineered being. On April 29, 2015, Paul Giamatti and Toby Jones were cast as a psychologist and chief scientist in charge of the lab facility, respectively. Boyd Holbrook was also set to play a nutritionist at the facility, and Jennifer Jason Leigh and Michelle Yeoh were later cast in supporting roles.

=== Filming ===
Principal photography on the film began on May 26, 2015, in Northern Ireland.

== Reception ==
=== Box office ===
In the United States, Morgan was released on September 2, 2016, and was originally projected to gross around $6 million from 2,020 theaters in its opening weekend. However, after grossing just $615,000 on its first day, weekend projections were lowered to $2 million. It went on to open to $2 million, finishing 18th at the box office. In its second weekend it grossed just $495,000, finishing 21st at the box office. It ultimately earned $8.8 million worldwide.

=== Critical response ===
Morgan received mixed reviews from critics. Rotten Tomatoes has given the film an approval rating of 38%, based on 154 reviews, with a weighted average score of 5.00/10. The site's critical consensus reads, "Morgan neglects to develop its decent premise, opting instead to settle for a garden-variety sci-fi thriller with more action than ideas." On Metacritic the film has a score of 48 out of 100, based on 33 critics, indicating "mixed or average reviews". Audiences polled by CinemaScore gave the film an average grade of "C+" on an A+ to F scale.

Keith Phipps of Uproxx praised the film's setup but criticized its execution, writing, "It floats a few interesting ideas it can't develop and it doesn't know how to ratchet up the tension or fold those ideas into thrills. And it's not like that can't be done with this premise, as Ex Machina already demonstrated." Richard Roeper of the Chicago Sun-Times gave the film one out of four stars, ranking the film #4 among his worst films of 2016 and saying: "The only thing worse than the first three-quarters of Morgan is the supposed payoff, which veers from the dumb to the really dumb to the so-dumb-you'll-hardly-believe it".
