= Lew McCreary =

American author, editor, and speaker (born 1947)

- Born: September 21, 1947 (age 78)
- Education: Wesleyan University
- Occupations: Author; editor; speaker

Lew McCreary (born September 21, 1947) is an American author, editor, and speaker.

== Biography ==
McCreary was born on September 21, 1947. He has authored three novels to sparse but positive reviews; in The New York Times Book Review of 1991's The Minus Man, acclaimed author Anne Rice said: "This is a challenging, disturbing and deeply memorable novel." In 1999, The Minus Man was made into an independent film starring Owen Wilson, Brian Cox, Janeane Garofalo, Mercedes Ruehl and several other notable actors, as well as Sheryl Crow and Dwight Yoakam.

In addition to his novels, McCreary has worked as a senior editor for Harvard Business Review and previously as editorial director of CXO Media, Inc., founding the security publication CSO Magazine and frequently serving as source for media outlets on issues of technology and security. He has served as a technology consultant for The Wall Street Journal and the Associated Press and has appeared on syndicated radio shows such as Marketplace as well as Bloomberg Radio, UPI Radio, Wall Street Journal Radio and USA Radio. McCreary's broadcast credits also include appearances on CNN and CNBC as well as WBZ-TV (Boston), WGBH-TV (Boston), and New England Cable News.

He has also written a number of unpublished novels.

McCreary graduated from Wesleyan University with a degree in English, and lives in Waltham, Massachusetts.

== Novels ==
- Mount's Mistake, 1987
- The Minus Man, 1991
- The Houseguest, 2001
