= Blade Runner Black Out 2022 =

2017 anime short film by Shinichirō Watanabe

Japanese name
- Kanji: ブレードランナー ブラックアウト2022
Transcriptions
- Revised Hepburn: Burēdoran'nā Burakkuauto 2022
- Directed by: Shinichirō Watanabe
- Written by: Shinichirō Watanabe
- Produced by: Joseph Chou; Al-Francis Cuenca; Shun Kashima; Nobuhiro Takenaka
- Starring: Jovan Jackson; Luci Christian; Edward James Olmos
- Cinematography: Shinichirō Etō
- Edited by: Kiyoshi Hirose
- Music by: Flying Lotus
- Production companies: CygamesPictures Alcon Entertainment
- Distributed by: Warner Bros. Pictures
- Release date: September 27, 2017
- Running time: 15 minutes
- Countries: Japan; United States
- Language: English

Blade Runner Black Out 2022 (Japanese: ブレードランナー ブラックアウト2022, Hepburn: Burēdoran'nā Burakkuauto 2022) is a 2017 Japanese cyberpunk tech-noir anime short film directed by Shinichiro Watanabe and animated by CygamesPictures. The short is one of three short films (with 2036: Nexus Dawn and 2048: Nowhere to Run) that serve as prequels to the live-action film Blade Runner 2049. It debuted on September 27, 2017 on Crunchyroll. The film also aired on Adult Swim's Toonami block on November 26, 2021.

== Plot ==
Three years after the events of Blade Runner, the Tyrell Corporation has developed the new Nexus-8 line of replicants. The models possess open-ended lifespans, like those of humans; unrest ensues. A replicant named Trixie is assaulted by human thugs, but is rescued by Iggy, a replicant ex-soldier who deserted after he learned that the enemy were also replicants. He recruits Trixie into an underground freedom replicant movement which sets out to sabotage the Tyrell Corporation's database and internet tracking, so that replicants cannot be so easily hunted.

Trixie then befriends Ren, a sympathetic human technician in charge of launching nuclear missiles. He agrees to redirect a test missile to detonate over Los Angeles. This will black out the city and, with an electromagnetic pulse, wipe out all electronic data. Trixie and Iggy set out to physically destroy the Tyrell Corporation's servers. Trixie dies in the attempt but the mission succeeds—servers powering the internet are destroyed and power to Los Angeles is permanently disabled. Iggy escapes and removes his right eye, which can identify him as a replicant.

A global collapse follows in which all replicant production ends and Tyrell goes bankrupt. The Wallace Corporation acquires Tyrell and restarts production of a new model a decade later.

== Cast ==
- Jovan Jackson as Iggy Cygnus
- Luci Christian as Trixie
- Bryson Baugus as Ren
- Edward James Olmos as Gaff

== Reception ==
The short has a rating of 7.3 on IMDb, a 4.4/5 on Crunchyroll, and a 3.6/5 on Letterboxd.

Ollie Barder of Forbes magazine wrote positively of the short, saying "[...] Black Out 2022 is expertly done and I only wished we had more of it. It combines much of the elements from Cowboy Bebop but also some of the bleakness from anime such as Armor Hunter Mellowlink, which Watanabe also worked on."

== See also ==
- Blade Runner: Black Lotus
- List of adaptations of works by Philip K. Dick
