= The Minus Man =

- Theatrical release poster
- Directed by: Hampton Fancher
- Screenplay by: Hampton Fancher
- Based on: The Minus Man by Lew McCreary
- Produced by: Keith Abell; Fida Attieh; David Bushell; Steve Carlis; Joseph J. DiMartino; Larry Meistrich; Mary Vernieu
- Starring: Owen Wilson; Janeane Garofalo; Brian Cox; Mercedes Ruehl; Dwight Yoakam; Dennis Haysbert; Sheryl Crow
- Cinematography: Bobby Bukowski
- Edited by: Todd C. Ramsay
- Music by: Marco Beltrami
- Production company: TSG Pictures
- Distributed by: Artisan Entertainment; The Shooting Gallery
- Release dates: January 25, 1999 (Sundance Film Festival); September 24, 1999 (Limited US Release); September 21, 2001 (Germany)
- Running time: 111 minutes
- Country: United States
- Language: English
- Box office: $370,668

The Minus Man is a 1999 thriller film starring Owen Wilson and Janeane Garofalo. It is based on the novel by Lew McCreary, and directed by Hampton Fancher, who also wrote the screenplay. The film centers on a serial killer whom Fancher describes as "a cross between Psycho's Norman Bates, Melville's Billy Budd and Being There's Chauncey Gardner".

== Plot ==
Vann Siegert is a wandering serial killer who poisons his victims; he explains that he feels he is helping them and that they die without pain. After killing a heroin addict named Casper he met at a bar, he makes her death look like an overdose and moves to a new town. The next day, he arrives at Doug and Jane Durwin's home and rents out the room of their missing daughter. Doug recommends he look for work at the post office, as they are hiring seasonal help for Christmas.

Doug takes Vann to a high school football game, where he meets Gene, a star athlete, and his family. A few days later, Vann offers the boy a ride and murders him, burying his body on a beach. While he digs the grave, Vann has an imaginary conversation with two detectives, Blair and Graves, who ask taunting questions about his methods. Later, Vann helps the town search for the missing athlete and even attends his memorial service. He reveals that killing Gene broke two of his personal rules: don't kill anyone you know, and don't kill anyone from your town. Vann's ties to the community grow as he is given more responsibility at the post office.

One of Vann's co-workers, Ferrin, sheepishly pursues him. Vann drives her to the beach, where the pair exchange an awkward hug directly over the spot where Vann buried Gene. On Christmas Day, Vann goes to a diner and chooses another victim. She invites him to her home, where he recognizes that she is a painter. Something about her work disturbs him and he flees without killing her. Vann returns to the diner and slips poison into the water of a man eating alone. An autopsy reveals that the death was the result of a rare poison derived from tree bark fungus found in the Pacific Northwest. The poison is then linked to Casper's death, and to Gene's when his body is found. Vann knows that the police will eventually tie the murders to him. While looking in the mirror, he pulls hairs off his jacket and puts them in an envelope on which he writes 'FERRiN'.

Jane is found dead from a blow to the back of the head. The police suspect Doug, but Vann is worried that the increased scrutiny from another murder will lead the police to him. During a date with Ferrin, he tries to initiate sex, which soon turns to assaulting her, and she screams at him to leave. The next day, the police arrest Doug for Jane's murder and Vann decides to flee town. Before he already leaves town, he puts his postal uniform and the envelope marked "FERRiN", containing the sample of his hair, in a mailbox. As he drives on the highway, Vann admits that he wants to lead a more regular life once he gets to wherever he is going. He is pursued by a cop who had earlier approached him on the beach. After taking a good look at him in the middle of her spotlight with her police cruiser, she smiles at him and takes the right fork in the road, while Vann takes the left.

== Cast ==
- Owen Wilson as Vann Siegert
- Dwight Yoakam as Detective Blair
- Dennis Haysbert as Detective Graves
- Alex Warren as State Trooper
- Mercedes Ruehl as Jane Durwin
- Brian Cox as Doug Durwin
- Janeane Garofalo as Ferrin
- Meg Foster as Irene
- John Vargas as Priest
- Eric Mabius as Gene
- Larry Miller as Paul
- Sheryl Crow as Casper
- John Carroll Lynch as The Bartender (uncredited)

== Reception ==
The film has a 58% approval rating on Rotten Tomatoes based on 36 reviews. The site’s critics consensus states: "While its subdued thrills and lack of answers may prove frustrating, The Minus Man delivers a chillingly measured performance from Owen Wilson." Metacritic, which uses a weighted average, assigned the film a score of 56 out of 100, based on 26 critics, indicating "mixed or average" reviews.

Roger Ebert called the film "a psychological thriller of uncommon power maybe because it's so quiet and devious". In the Los Angeles Times, Kevin Thomas wrote "it is above all such an unsettling experience you find yourself still taking it all in well after the lights have gone up".

In praising the film, Andrew Sarris writing for the New York Observer said: "A surging undercurrent of black comedy drives us out to sea without ever breaking to the surface with glib psychological or sociological explanations. We cannot laugh out loud, nor can we feel any grief". Sarris singles out Garofalo's performance as "incandescent ... one of the most enticingly endearing female movie characters in recent years – witty, bubbly, but at the same time lonely and terrified of rejection". Glenn Lovell described the film as "an assured blend of Camus and Hitch's small-town classic, Shadow of a Doubt" in his Variety review.

The film was nominated for the Grand Jury Prize at the Sundance Film Festival.

== Marketing ==
The Shooting Gallery's The Minus Man promotional campaign and materials, like many independent films (see Sony Pictures Classics' When the Cat's Away and Miramax's The Crying Game) tried to spark discussion/word of mouth among audience members after they left the theater. In addition to the tagline "Don't see it alone. Unless you like talking to yourself", one trailer for the film showed a couple discussing the film as they leave the theater. Their conversation takes them from place to place all over the city, until the man (played by Eddie Ifft) marvels at how beautiful the sunrise is. The woman (played by Marin Hinkle) realizes she is late for work and rushes to her job as a lifeguard, where two people are floating dead in the pool. The ad ends with the tagline "Careful, you can talk about it for hours". They partnered with local coffee houses and bars to provide opportunities for these supposed hour-long conversations.

The main trailer featured the tagline: "When he's around nothing adds up" and touted the film as the product of "the producers of Sling Blade" and "the writer of Blade Runner and The Mighty Quinn".
