= Blade Runner 2049 =

2017 film by Denis Villeneuve

- Theatrical release poster
- Directed by: Denis Villeneuve
- Screenplay by: Hampton Fancher; Michael Green
- Story by: Hampton Fancher
- Based on: Characters from Do Androids Dream of Electric Sheep? by Philip K. Dick
- Produced by: Andrew A. Kosove; Broderick Johnson; Bud Yorkin; Cynthia Sikes Yorkin
- Starring: Ryan Gosling; Harrison Ford; Ana de Armas; Sylvia Hoeks; Robin Wright; Mackenzie Davis; Carla Juri; Lennie James; Dave Bautista; Jared Leto
- Cinematography: Roger A. Deakins
- Edited by: Joe Walker
- Music by: Benjamin Wallfisch; Hans Zimmer
- Production companies: Alcon Entertainment; Columbia Pictures; Scott Free Productions; Bud Yorkin Productions; Torridon Films; 16:14 Entertainment
- Distributed by: Warner Bros. Pictures (United States and Canada); Sony Pictures Releasing International (International)
- Release dates: October 3, 2017 (Dolby Theatre); October 6, 2017 (United States)
- Running time: 163 minutes
- Country: United States
- Language: English
- Budget: $150–185 million
- Box office: $287.3 million

Blade Runner 2049 is a 2017 American science fiction thriller film directed by Denis Villeneuve from a screenplay by Hampton Fancher and Michael Green, based on a story by Fancher. A sequel to Blade Runner (1982), the film stars Ryan Gosling and Harrison Ford, with Ana de Armas, Sylvia Hoeks, Robin Wright, Mackenzie Davis, Dave Bautista, and Jared Leto in supporting roles. Ford and Edward James Olmos reprise their roles from the previous film as Rick Deckard and Gaff, respectively. Gosling plays K, a "blade runner" who uncovers a secret that threatens to destabilize society and the course of civilization.

Ideas for a Blade Runner sequel were first proposed in the 1990s, but licensing issues stalled their development. Andrew Kosove and Broderick Johnson obtained the film rights from Bud Yorkin. Ridley Scott stepped down as the film's initial director and worked as an executive producer, while Villeneuve was later appointed to direct. Blade Runner 2049 was financed through a partnership between Alcon Entertainment and Sony Pictures, as well as a Hungarian government-funded tax rebate. Warner Bros., which had distributed its predecessor, released the film on behalf of Alcon in North America, while Sony handled distribution in international markets. Principal photography took place mostly at two soundstages in Budapest over four months from July to November 2016.

Blade Runner 2049 premiered at the Dolby Theatre in Los Angeles, California on October 3, 2017, and was released in the United States on October 6. The film received acclaim from critics, who praised multiple aspects including cast performances, directing, cinematography, and faithfulness to the previous film. However, it was a box office disappointment, grossing $287.3 million worldwide against a production budget of $150–185 million and failing to reach its estimated break-even point of $400 million. Among its numerous accolades, Blade Runner 2049 received Academy Awards for Best Cinematography and Best Visual Effects out of five nominations, and eight British Academy Film Awards nominations, winning for Best Cinematography and Best Special Visual Effects.

== Plot ==
In 2049 Los Angeles, bioengineered humans known as replicants are still used for slave labor. K (short for serial number, KD6-3.7), a Nexus-9 replicant, works for the Los Angeles Police Department as a "blade runner", an officer who hunts and "retires" (kills) rogue replicant models.

After "retiring" replicant Sapper Morton, K finds a box buried under a tree at Morton's farm. It contained the remains of a female replicant who died during a caesarean section. This demonstrates that replicants could reproduce biologically, previously thought impossible. K's superior, Lt. Joshi, fears this knowledge will lead to war between humans and replicants, so she orders K to retire the replicant child and destroy all related evidence.

K visits the Wallace Corporation, successor to the defunct Tyrell Corporation in the manufacture of replicants. DNA archives identify the deceased female as an experimental Nexus-7 replicant. K learns of her romantic ties with former blade runner Rick Deckard. (Note: As depicted in Blade Runner (1982)) CEO Niander Wallace wants the secret to replicant reproduction to expand interstellar colonization through their slave labor. He sends his replicant enforcer, Luv, to monitor K. An unidentified figure engages several prostitutes in the city, including one named Mariette, to keep eyes on K.

At Morton's farm, K finds the date 6.10.21 carved into the tree trunk and recognizes it from a childhood memory of a wooden toy horse. Because replicant memories are artificial, K's holographic AI girlfriend Joi suggests that this is evidence that K was born, not created. K discovers in LAPD records that two children born on that date have identical DNA, but are inexplicably registered as being opposite genders, and that the girl died from a genetic disorder. K's search for the boy leads him to an orphanage, but the records from the year in question are missing. K recognizes the orphanage from his memories and finds the toy horse in the furnace where he remembers hiding it. He then visits replicant-memory-maker Dr. Ana Stelline, who confirms that his memory of the orphanage is a real memory that someone lived, leading K to conclude he is the deceased replicant woman's son. K then fails a baseline test, marking him as rogue. When he implies to Joshi that he killed the replicant child, she gives him 48 hours to pass the test, or he will be retired himself.

Joi hires prostitute replicant Mariette to sync with to be able to have sex with K. The following morning, Mariette places a tracker in K's jacket prior to leaving. K then takes the wooden toy horse to be analyzed for its origin, which leads him to the ruins of a now radioactive Las Vegas. There he finds Deckard, who informs him that the deceased replicant woman was named Rachael, and that he is the father of Rachael's child. Deckard had helped the Replicant Freedom Movement scramble the birth records to protect the child's identity. Deckard then left the child with the Movement to ensure the hunted child would not be found through him. Luv, who has killed Joshi, tracks K to Las Vegas. She kidnaps Deckard, destroys Joi, and leaves an injured K behind. Using Mariette's tracker, the Movement rescues K. Their leader, Freysa, saddens K with the revelation that Rachael's child was actually a girl. Fearing that Deckard may give up the freedom movement to Wallace and endanger the child, Freysa urges K to kill him. K deduces that the memory of the toy horse actually belongs to Dr. Stelline, and she is Rachael's daughter.

Luv takes Deckard to meet Wallace, who offers Deckard a duplicate Rachael in exchange for information about the child's whereabouts. Deckard refuses the offer, so Wallace has Luv kill the duplicate. As Luv transports Deckard to be tortured off-world, K intercedes. He fights and drowns Luv but is mortally wounded in the process.

K tells Deckard that he will be presumed dead, and is now free to go to his daughter, and then takes him to Dr. Stelline's facility. Standing outside the facility, he hands Deckard the toy horse. Deckard enters the building and meets Dr. Stelline, while K dies on the front steps. (Note: In an interview with Entertainment Weekly, Blade Runner 2049 screenwriter Michael Green confirmed that K dies as he lies on the steps.)

== Cast ==
- Ryan Gosling as K
- Harrison Ford as Rick Deckard
- Ana de Armas as Joi
- Sylvia Hoeks as Luv
- Robin Wright as Lt. Joshi
- Mackenzie Davis as Mariette
- Carla Juri as Dr. Ana Stelline
- Lennie James as Mister Cotton
- Dave Bautista as Sapper Morton
- Jared Leto as Niander Wallace
- Edward James Olmos as Gaff
- Barkhad Abdi as Doc Badger
- Hiam Abbass as Freysa
- David Dastmalchian as Coco
- Wood Harris as Nandez
- Sallie Harmsen as Replicant
- Tómas Lemarquis as Wallace Corporation file clerk

Archival footage, audio, and stills of Sean Young from the original film are used to represent both her original character of Rachael and a duplicate of the character created by Niander Wallace. Young's likeness was digitally superimposed onto Loren Peta, who was coached by Young on how to recreate her performance from the first film. The voice of the replicant was created with the use of a sound-alike actress to Young. Young was credited for her work.

== Production ==
=== Development ===
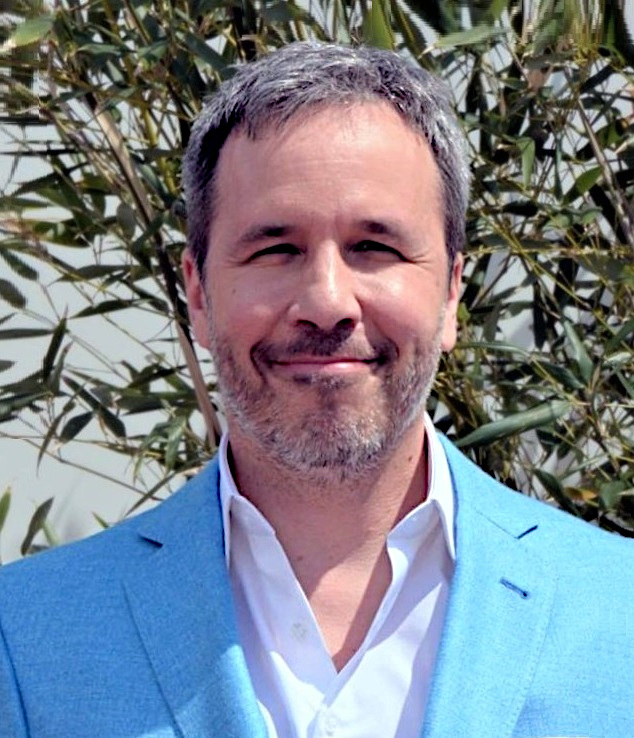
Director Denis Villeneuve credits Blade Runner for igniting his passion for filmmaking.

From the 1990s, licensing disputes over Philip K. Dick's novel Do Androids Dream of Electric Sheep? (1968) had deterred the creation of sequels to the science fiction drama Blade Runner (1982). Director Ridley Scott conceived two ultimately unrealized projects vaguely connected to the Blade Runner canon in the interim, such as a stand-alone sequel titled Metropolis. Scott's second project, a collaboration with his son Luke and younger brother Tony titled Purefold, had been imagined as an episodic webseries examining conceptions of empathy.

Nearly three decades after the film's release, Alcon Entertainment co-founders Andrew Kosove and Broderick Johnson purchased the intellectual property from producer Bud Yorkin. The terms of Alcon's acquisition prohibited the remake of the original Blade Runner film, but entitled the company rights to syndication, franchising, and derivative media such as prequels and sequels. No longer satisfied with the profits of their smaller-budget features, and with investor funding scarce, Kosove and Johnson sought to increase Alcon's output of blockbuster films: "If you don't have repetitive cash flow, which is a fancy way of saying being in the sequel business, you are going to be in trouble eventually". Progress on a new Blade Runner feature soon accelerated when Kosove named Christopher Nolan one of his ideal choices to direct. However, Nolan said he never planned to direct, despite being an admirer of the Blade Runner franchise.

By August 2011, Alcon had announced Ridley Scott's signing as the film's director to the press. The British filmmaker had long desired a sequel to expand upon the subject matter. After securing Scott's services, the studio assigned Michael Green and a returning Hampton Fancher the responsibility for writing the script. Alcon producers provided some insight into their vision but were unsure of how to approach the Blade Runner story, hence they and the normally candid Scott were tight-lipped when questioned further about the sequel's artistic direction in interviews conducted during pre-production. Ultimately, Scott resigned from his duties once his existing commitment to Alien: Covenant (2017) took precedence, but retained partial oversight as an executive producer. He also made significant contributions to the screenplay, albeit in an uncredited role.

Blade Runner 2049 was Alcon's second collaboration with director Denis Villeneuve, whom they called for a meeting at a cafe in rural New Mexico to negotiate an offer. They had an existing professional relationship from Prisoners (2013). Villeneuve credits Blade Runner for inspiring his passion for filmmaking, but hesitated to accept the assignment at first as he feared tarnishing the franchise's legacy. Nevertheless, he liked the screenplay and was assured by Fancher's investment in the project. Villeneuve preserved elements of the original film by modernizing Blade Runner's retrofuturistic onscreen world, which he saw as imperative for an authentic story.

A scene from Steven Spielberg's Ready Player One (2018) set in the Blade Runner universe was excluded from the film's finished cut. Spielberg had sought copyright approval during the filming of Blade Runner 2049, which Alcon producers refused as they feared the explicit reference would affect their commercial prospects, even though Ready Player One was released months later. Consequently, Spielberg opted to replace the scene for one based on The Shining (1980) owing to his friendship with Stanley Kubrick.

=== Casting ===
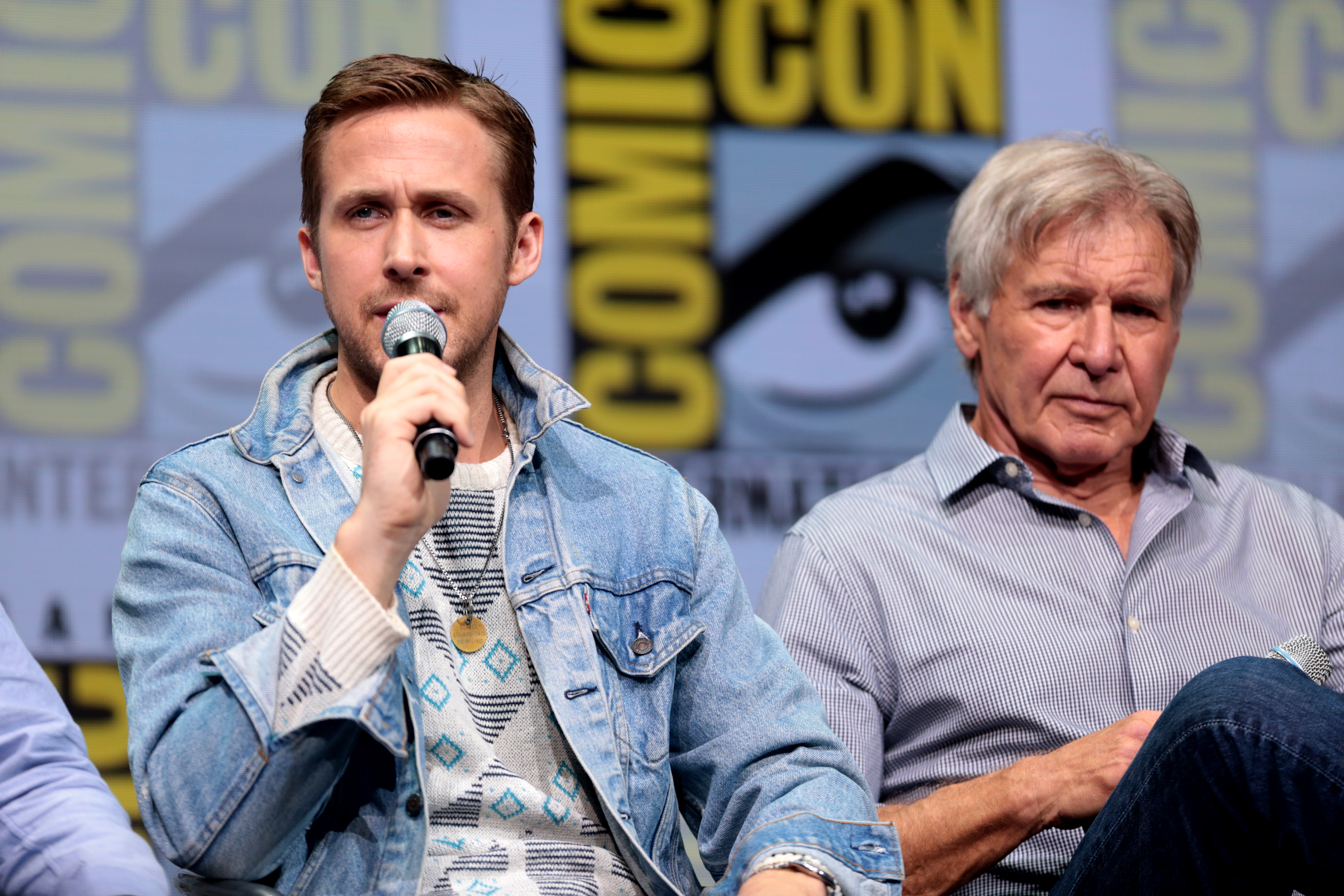
Ryan Gosling and Harrison Ford promoting the film at the 2017 San Diego Comic-Con

Harrison Ford and Ryan Gosling were Blade Runner 2049's first significant casting choices. Gossip about Ford's participation had been circulating in the media since the project's conception, claims which the producers initially denied, having only approached the actor for a part in 2014. Alcon did not publicly announce their signing until the following year. Ford had expressed interest in reprising his role in past interviews and was enthusiastic about the Blade Runner 2049 script. The working conditions on set were another aspect of the production pleasing to Ford, in contrast to the stressful shooting environment endured on Blade Runner. Ford stated the thirty five-year passage of time, plus the synthesis of a new story with Deckard's already-established backstory, lent context necessary to playing his aged character. Edward James Olmos, the only other returning Blade Runner actor, appears in a supporting part which pivots the main story.

The screenwriters tailored K specifically for Gosling, but it was the opportunity to work with Villeneuve and experienced cinematographer Roger Deakins, paired with his faith in the script, that convinced the actor to join Blade Runner 2049 in his first leading role in a blockbuster production. Gosling had developed a reputation for his discriminating film choices; the prospect of working on big-budget franchise sets never enticed him, yet he trusted the filmmakers' instincts, and the thematic complexity of the script further reassured his decision. A longtime Blade Runner fan, the actor remarked that his first viewing experience of the film as a young teenager was profound: "It was one of the first films I had seen where it wasn't clear how I was supposed to feel when it was over. It really makes you question your idea of the hero and the villain, the idea of what it means to be human." Blade Runner 2049 proved challenging for Gosling because of the production's scope. Gosling also helped rewrite the dialog for the "baseline test" scene, which Villeneuve felt wasn't "aggressive" enough; Gosling suggested using a variation of the "dropping in"-technique developed by Shakespeare & Company.

An actress of national renown in Spain who aspired to break into English-speaking roles, Ana de Armas auditioned several times before landing the film's female lead. After shooting for her first Hollywood film Hands of Stone (2016), de Armas settled in Los Angeles in pursuit of a role that did not typecast her ethnicity. She underwent four months of rigorous speech training to master her English before auditioning. Once the studio commenced production of Blade Runner 2049, the actress said her fitness training provided the necessary mental space to prepare for the intense shooting schedule.

Villeneuve considered David Bowie, one of the franchise's core influences, for the part of Niander Wallace until the musician died months prior to filming. He and the producers subsequently looked at Jared Leto, fresh off filming the DC Extended Universe (DCEU) film Suicide Squad (2016), as they felt he exuded Bowie's rockstar sensibility. Leto refrains from naming specific sources that shaped certain aspects of his character's persona; rather the actor cites real-life friends who work in tech as a general influence. Notorious for his unorthodox preparation for roles, Leto continued his unusual practices in Blade Runner 2049 by wearing custom opaque contact lenses to work the set completely blind. Villeneuve recalled his first day shooting with the actor: "He entered the room, and he could not see at all. He was walking with an assistant very slowly. It was like seeing Jesus walking into a temple. Everybody became super silent, and there was a kind of sacred moment. Everyone was in awe. It was so beautiful and powerful—I was moved to tears."

A raft of mostly young actors comprise Blade Runner 2049's supporting cast; David Dastmalchian, Sylvia Hoeks, Carla Juri, Mackenzie Davis and Barkhad Abdi were lesser-known stars with years of expertise in independent cinema. Among the few exceptions are Dave Bautista, Hiam Abbass, and Lennie James, whose castings were revealed between April and July 2016; and Robin Wright, assigned to one of three major female roles in Blade Runner 2049. Wright's involvement had been rumored for weeks, but was not immediately confirmed by the filmmakers as her commitments to the Netflix series House of Cards (2013–2018) momentarily stalled negotiations.

=== Filming ===
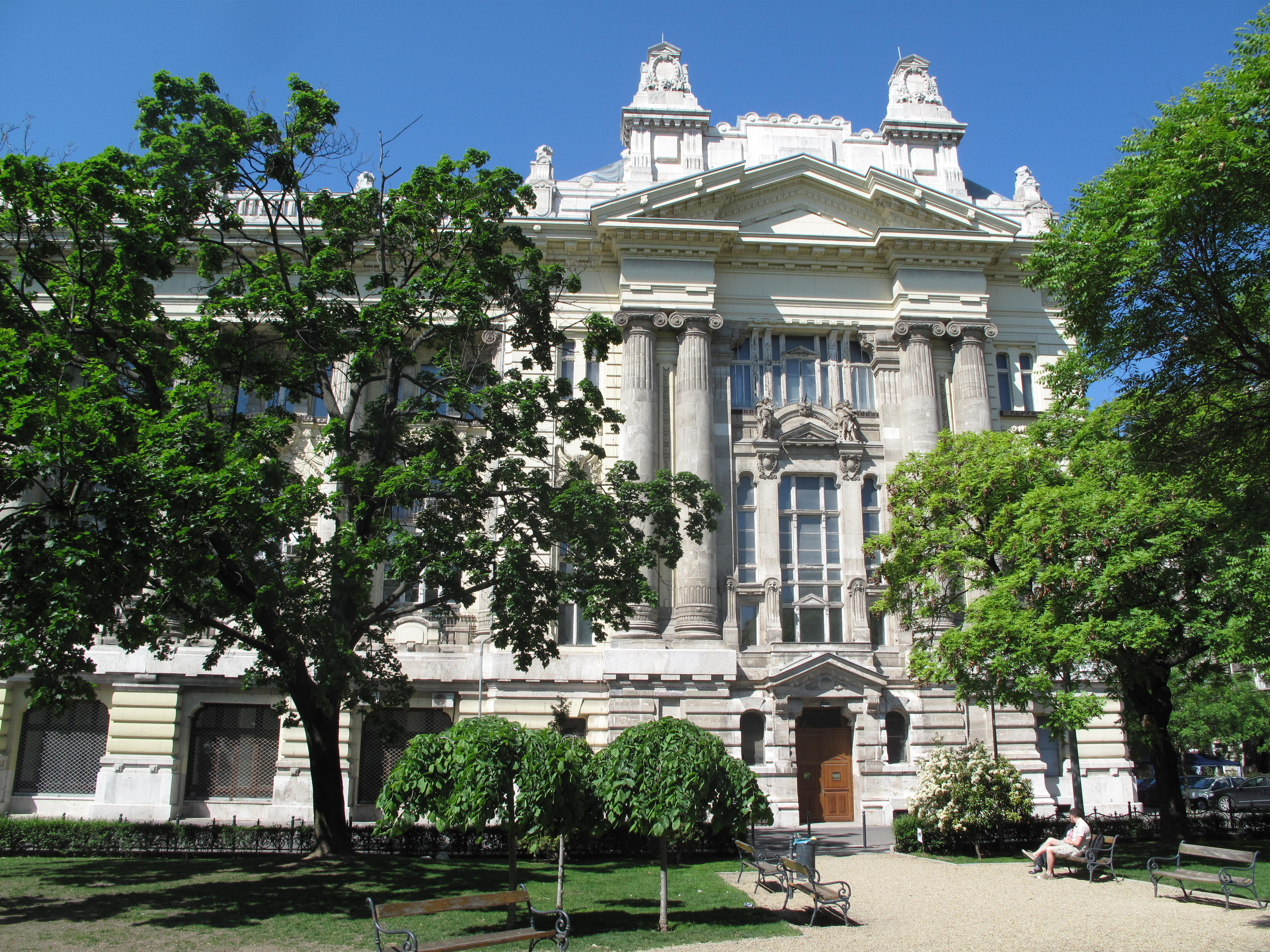
The exterior of the Budapest Stock Exchange's Liberty Square palace, whose interior doubled for Las Vegas in casino-set scenes

The filmmakers embarked on location scouting in April 2016, and principal photography of Blade Runner 2049 commenced that July, lasting four months until November. They first toured London but found no soundstage available for the needs of the production. As a result, Deakins and Villeneuve flew to Hungary for location scouting partly due to Scott's familiarity with the country's network of facilities. They also toured Slovakia to source architectural ideas. Blade Runner 2049's production crew were mostly Hungarian, with some American staff hired to supervise the set. Inserts with Wright and Hoeks were the first scenes filmed on set. Shooting took place mainly at Korda Studios and the Origo Studios backlot in suburban Budapest, where the shoot qualified for a 25% tax rebate on in-state costs from the Hungarian government.

The Alcon–Sony partnership allocated $180 million ($90 million each) for the budget, rebates notwithstanding. Interior shots of the Budapest Stock Exchange's Liberty Square palace doubled for Las Vegas in casino-set scenes, and abandoned Soviet industrial sites such as the abandoned Inota and Kelenföld power plants were important filming locations that emphasized Blade Runner 2049's dystopian ethos. The Budapest palace was the film's largest set, occupying at least three floors of the building. Filmmakers revised Deckard's capture by Luv into a simple conversational scene after Ford conveyed to Kosove and Johnson his disapproval of the dialogue.

Pitfalls occasionally beset the production. The filmmakers frequently fell behind schedule, and an Origo Studios-employed subcontractor was killed by falling debris when dismantling one of the sets. Gosling's obligation to fulfill a New York City press junket for La La Land (2016) exacerbated the unusual circumstances of the shoot; however, his scenes were able to be filmed in time for the Thanksgiving holiday.

=== Cinematography ===
Blade Runner 2049 is the third Deakins–Villeneuve collaboration after Prisoners and Sicario (2015). Together with production designer Dennis Gassner, the men brainstormed ideas for the film's visual palette as Villeneuve was editing his science fiction drama Arrival (2016). The sequences were then storyboarded and left for Deakins and Villeneuve to execute. The two were inspired by the architecture of several global cities to develop a hostile, imposing brutalist style for their fictionalized Los Angeles, among them the appearance of Beijing's cityscape in dense smog, the foothills of southern Spain, Bangladeshi shipyards, and certain mid-twentieth-century landmarks in London (such as the Barbican Estate and Trellick Tower). For Las Vegas-set scenes, the filmmakers researched intense dust storms in the Sahara, Saudi Arabia and Sydney to replicate the sandy desert ruins Villeneuve sought.

It became apparent to Deakins that Blade Runner 2049 would be one of his biggest undertakings because of the technical demands involved in realizing the onscreen universe. Deakins exercises full artistic control of his shoots, and the extent of his oversight meant a single-camera setup for the set—the British cinematographer rejected a studio line producer's request for a nine unit-camera setup because he firmly believed said technique would yield sloppy camerawork. Rather, he and Villeneuve reprised the practical approach of their previous collaborations to capture the Blade Runner 2049 scenes. They shot the project in 1.55:1 aspect ratio from a single Arri Alexa XT Studio camera with Zeiss Master Prime lenses, assisted with an attached crane arm or a dolly. The filmmakers conducted tests with an Alexa 65 camera but preferred the XT Studio's somewhat grainy image quality, and the choice of lenses corresponded to the scale and lighting specifications of the scenes. For example, close-up character scenes were captured in 32 mm lenses, but filmmakers captured sweeping cityscape shots with 14 mm and 16 mm lenses. Occasionally, Arri Alexa Mini cameras were used to represent views from the spinners, the vehicles used in the film.

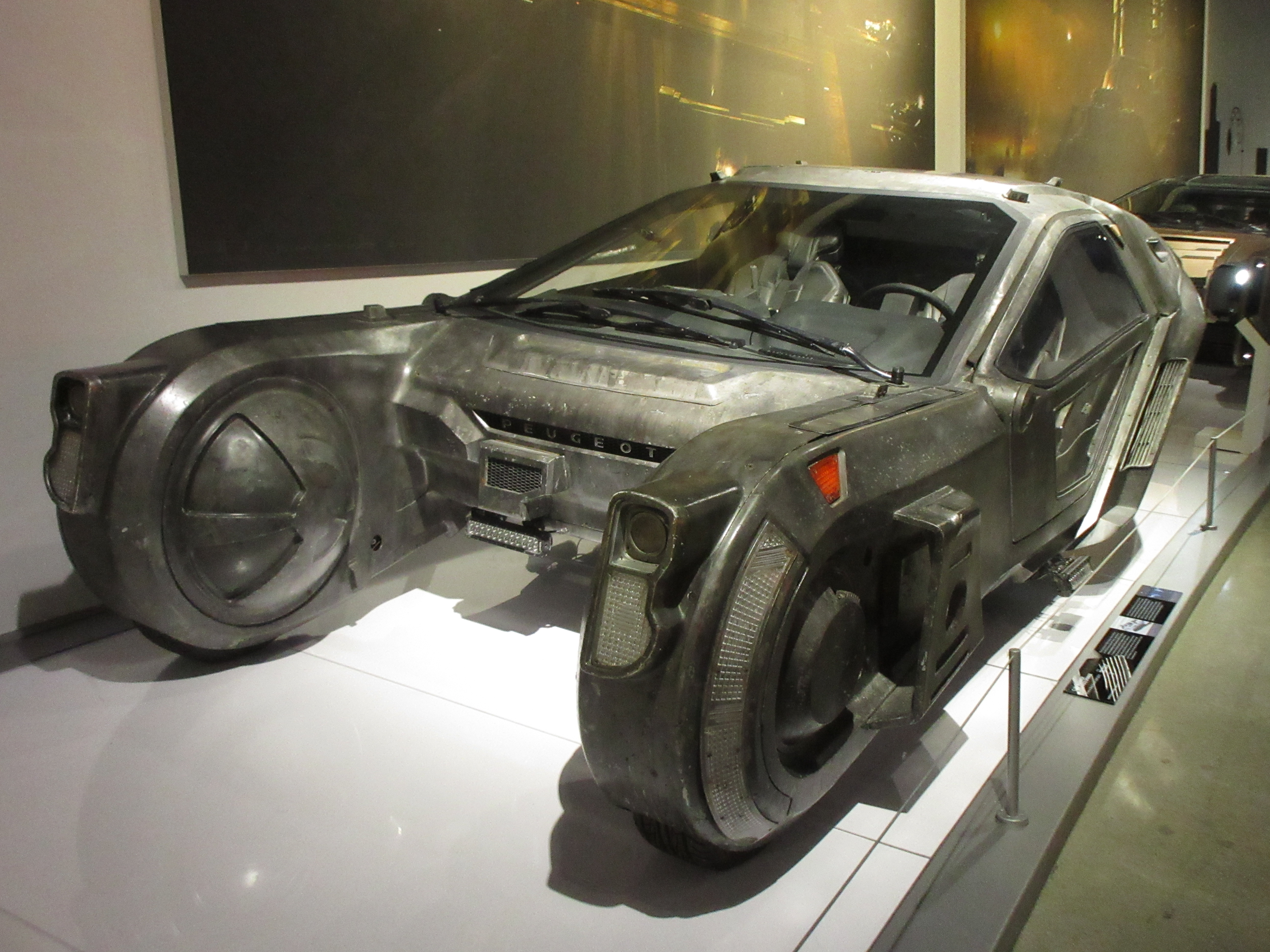
Spinner on display at the Petersen Automotive Museum, Los Angeles

When Gassner was first approached for Blade Runner 2049, he was called with a request from Villeneuve to observe the shape of passing street sweepers. The designer had known Scott since 1982, when they first collaborated for the Francis Ford Coppola-directed musical One From the Heart (1982). Redesigning the spinners then became one of his initial responsibilities. He and the filmmakers envisioned a harsh, angular design for the spinners, one intended to evoke the sense of technological innovation. It was also up to Gassner to complete most of the Blade Runner 2049 sets so producers could exercise full artistic control of the shoot. Gassner described the process as especially difficult as design elements had to be distinct but lore-faithful, with everything executed under a tight shooting schedule.

=== Costumes ===
Costume designer Renée April produced costumes featuring fake fur, painted cotton disguised as shearling, and breathing masks. April initially researched the fashion styles of the 1960s and 1970s, but elected to research various decades for influence as well as both Eastern and Western culture. When discussing the film, she stated she did not consider it a fashionable one. "I made costumes for the dark, wet, polluted, miserable world that Denis [Villeneuve] created. I had to hold myself back and remove anything too avant-garde or outré because it did not help the story. There were no superhero suits because the world needed to be realistic, and the characters relatable." When April discussed the film with Villeneuve about what direction she should take the costumes, Villeneuve told her "brutal", a similar description he gave to Gassner. "So I took it from there and made it tougher. Also, we did not want to do something science-fiction. We wanted to do it realistic. I did not want costumes with [lots of] zippers and plastic. So my job was to make the characters believable."

=== Post-production ===
Warner Bros. announced in early October 2016 that the film would be titled Blade Runner 2049. Editing commenced in December in Los Angeles, with the intention of having the film be rated R. At the 2017 San Diego Comic-Con, Villeneuve said the film would run for two hours and 32 minutes. An early cut of the film was four hours long, and Villeneuve described this version as "quite strong", but also at times "too self-indulgent". He said he prefers the shorter final version, which is "more elegant", though Ridley Scott has voiced the opinion that it is still too long. Villeneuve said he will not show the four-hour cut to anyone. As with Skyfall (2012), cinematographer Roger Deakins created his own IMAX master of the film, rather than using the proprietary "DMR" process that IMAX usually uses with films not shot with IMAX cameras.

== Music ==
Rapper-producer El-P said he was asked to compose music for the first Blade Runner 2049 trailer, but his score was "rejected (or ignored)". Jóhann Jóhannsson, who had worked with Villeneuve on Prisoners, Sicario and Arrival, was initially announced as composer for the film. Villeneuve and Jóhannsson decided to end the collaboration, however, because Villeneuve thought the film "needed something different", and also that he "needed to go back to something closer to Vangelis's soundtrack" of the first film. Composers Hans Zimmer and Benjamin Wallfisch joined the project in July 2017. In September, Jóhannsson's agent confirmed that he was no longer involved and was contractually forbidden from commenting. The musical cue during the final scene, "Tears in the Rain", is a call-back to the "Tears in rain" scene from Blade Runner which saw the death of the film's central antagonist Roy Batty. The track is a reimagined version of the original Vangelis work. Additionally, a segment from Sergei Prokofiev's musical composition "Peter and the Wolf" (Russian: Петя и волк) plays whenever the emanator is activated or deactivated.

== Release ==
=== Marketing ===
Warner Bros. and Columbia Pictures jointly released an announcement teaser on December 19, 2016. A selection of excerpts (lasting 15 seconds) were released as a trailer tease on May 5, 2017, in the lead-up to the full trailer, which was released on May 8, 2017. A second trailer was released on July 17, 2017.

=== Theatrical ===
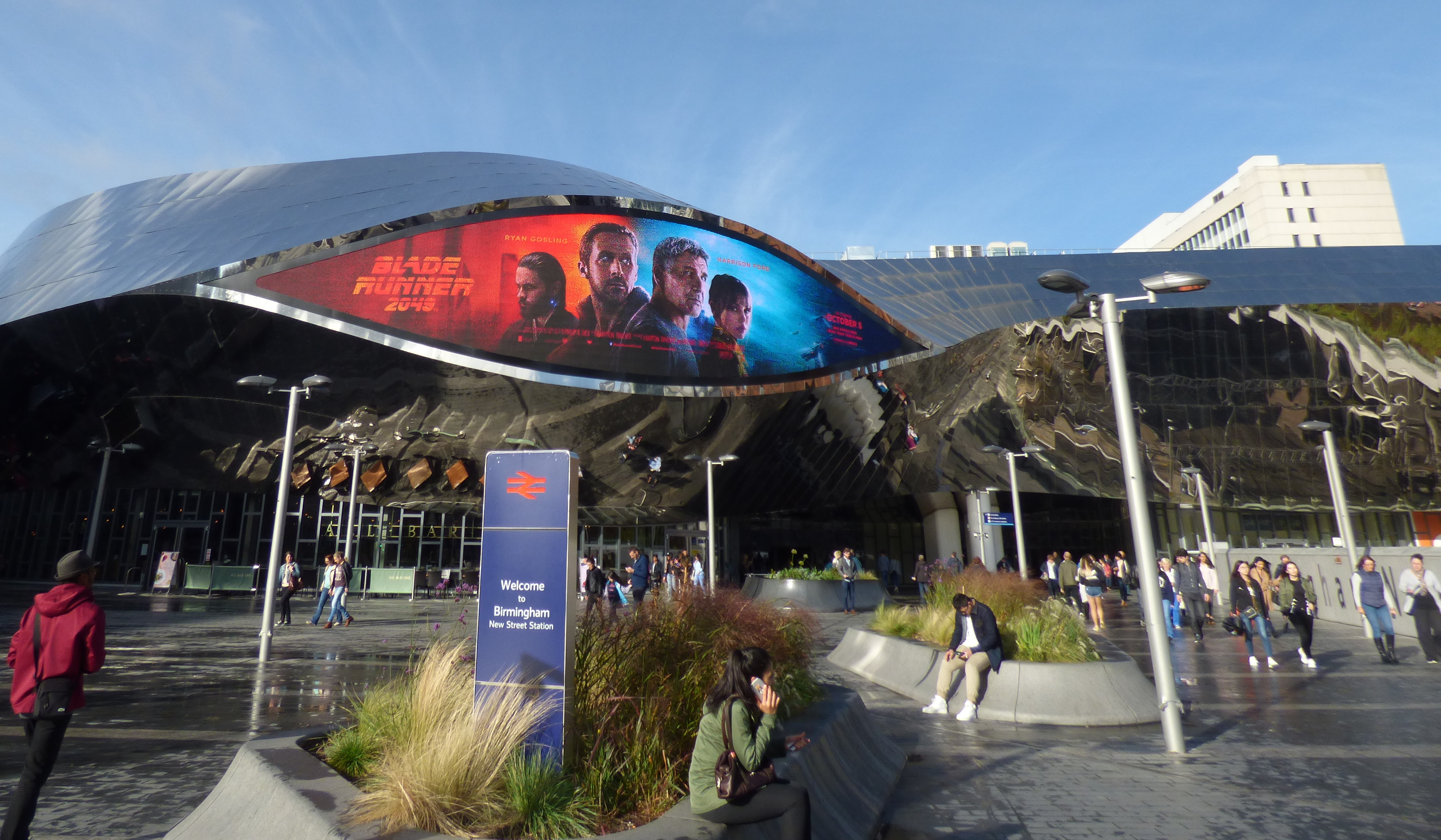
An advertisement for the film at Birmingham New Street Station, October 2017

Blade Runner 2049 premiered on October 3, 2017, at the Dolby Theatre in Los Angeles, although following the 2017 Las Vegas Strip shooting, the red carpet events were canceled prior to the screening. It was the opening feature at the Festival du nouveau cinéma in Montreal the following day. It also was premiered in Switzerland at the Zurich Film Festival on October 4, 2017. Sony Pictures Releasing, which had obtained rights to release the film in overseas territories, was the first to release Blade Runner 2049 in theaters, first in France and Belgium on October 4, 2017, then in other countries on the two following days. The film was released by Warner Bros. in North America on October 6, 2017. Alcon Entertainment partnered with Oculus VR to create and distribute content for the film exclusively for its virtual reality format and launched it alongside the theatrical release of October 6, 2017. That content would later be referred to as Blade Runner: Revelations. Due to the popularity and preference of IMAX in 2D (as opposed to 3D) among filmgoers in North America, the film was shown in IMAX theaters in only 2D domestically, but was screened in 3D formats internationally. Just like Skyfall, the movie was specially formatted for IMAX at the expanded aspect ratio of 1.9:1. The film is rated R by the Motion Picture Association of America for "violence, some sexuality, nudity, and language".

Some scenes in the film that featured nudity were censored in Turkey. This decision received criticism from the country's film critics.

=== Short films ===
Three short films were made to explore events that occur in the 30 years between Blade Runner, which is set in 2019, and Blade Runner 2049:

- 2036: Nexus Dawn is directed by Luke Scott, and follows Niander Wallace as he presents a new Nexus-9 replicant to lawmakers in an attempt to have a prohibition on replicants lifted. The short film also stars Benedict Wong as one of the lawmakers.
- 2048: Nowhere to Run, also directed by Scott, follows Sapper Morton as he protects a mother and daughter from thugs, outing himself as a replicant in the process.
- Blade Runner Black Out 2022, is an anime directed by Shinichirō Watanabe wherein a rogue replicant named Iggy carries out an operation to detonate a nuclear warhead over Los Angeles, triggering an electromagnetic pulse that erases the Tyrell Corporation's database of registered replicants. Edward James Olmos reprises his role as Gaff in this film. Flying Lotus composed the soundtrack; Watanabe had used his music as a temp score in making a rough cut of the short.

=== Anime series ===
Blade Runner: Black Lotus, is an anime TV Series Created by Toonami and Crunchyroll that takes place in 2032 in Los Angeles focusing on a female Replicant protagonist. The series was Directed by Shinji Aramaki and Kenji Kamiyama with Shinichirō Watanabe as Creative Director.

=== Home media ===
The film was released on DVD, Blu-ray, Blu-ray 3D, and 4K Blu-ray on January 16, 2018. It made approximately $29 million in US physical home media sales.

== Reception ==
=== Box office ===
Blade Runner 2049 grossed $92.1 million in the United States and Canada, and $195.2 million in other territories, for a worldwide total of $287.3 million, against a production budget between $150–185 million. The projected worldwide total the film needed to gross in order to break even was estimated to be around $400 million, and in November 2017, The Hollywood Reporter wrote that the film was expected to lose Alcon as much as $80 million. Ridley Scott attributed the film's underperformance to the runtime, saying: "It's slow. Long. Too long. I would have taken out half an hour."

In the United States and Canada, the film was initially projected to gross $43–47 million in its opening weekend. In September 2017, a survey from Fandango indicated that the film was one of the most anticipated releases of the season. It made $4 million from Thursday night previews, including $800,000 from IMAX theaters, but just $12.6 million on its first day, lowering weekend estimates to $32 million. It made $11.3 million on Saturday and went on to debut to $31.5 million, performing below both projections but still finishing first at the box office and marking the biggest openings of Villeneuve and Gosling's careers. The film would hold Gosling's opening weekend record for six years until 2023 when it was overtaken by Barbie. Regarding the opening weekend, director Villeneuve said, "It's a mystery. All the indexes and marketing tools they were using predicted that it would be a success. The film was acclaimed by critics. So everyone expected the first weekend's results to be impressive, and they were shocked. They still don't understand."

Deadline Hollywood attributed the film's performance to the 163-minute runtime limiting the number of showtimes theaters could have, lack of appeal to mainstream audiences, and the marketing being vague and relying on nostalgia and established fanbase to carry it. In its second weekend, the film dropped 52.7% to $15.5 million, finishing second behind newcomer Happy Death Day ($26 million) and dropped another 54% in its third weekend to $7.2 million, finishing in 4th behind Boo 2! A Madea Halloween, Geostorm, and Happy Death Day.

Overseas, the film was expected to debut to an additional $60 million, for a worldwide opening of around $100 million. It actually made $50.2 million internationally, finishing number one in 45 markets, for a global opening of $81.7 million. The film made $8 million in the United Kingdom, $4.9 million in Russia, $1.8 million in Brazil, and $3.6 million in Australia. It debuted in China on October 27, where it made $7.7 million opening weekend, which was considered a disappointment.

=== Critical response ===
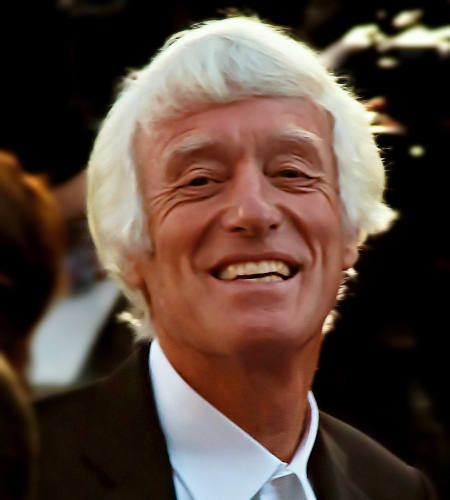
Roger Deakins' work on the film received critical acclaim and earned him his first Academy Award for Best Cinematography.

Blade Runner 2049 was well received by the American press, and various US publications included the film in their end-of-2017 lists. Critics who saw the film before its release were asked by Villeneuve not to reveal certain characters and plot points in those early reviews.

On the review aggregator website Rotten Tomatoes, 88% of 440 critics' reviews are positive, with an average rating of 8.3/10. The website's consensus reads: "Visually stunning and narratively satisfying, Blade Runner 2049 deepens and expands its predecessor's story while standing as an impressive filmmaking achievement in its own right." Metacritic, which uses a weighted average, assigned the film a score of 81 out of 100, based on 54 critics, indicating "universal acclaim". Audiences polled by CinemaScore gave the film an average grade of "A−" on an A+ to F scale.

Critical reviews compared the sequel favorably to Blade Runner as a worthy successor advancing the franchise mythos, though some were conflicted over the pacing and tonal shifts of the story, and the film drew occasional disapproval from reviewers who felt it lacked the spectacle and dramatic depth of its predecessor. The film's craftsmanship was the main source of praise from journalists, who routinely singled out Villeneuve for his expertise: A. O. Scott of The New York Times viewed Blade Runner 2049 as an introspection of Villeneuve's own sensibilities, the product of a director exuding an "unnerving calm", while Mick LaSalle of the San Francisco Chronicle said the film seemed to employ a similar narrative tone to the director's late period films such as Arrival.

The Villeneuve–Deakins collaboration was noted for the creation of cinematography displaying "the kind of complex artistry one would expect from the profession's top veteran", with Deakins' work described as "bleakly beautiful". Other aspects of Blade Runner 2049, such as the set design, writing, and scoring, were cited among the strengths of the film.

The actors' performances were a principal topic of discussion among critics. Critiques of the dynamic of the cast were positive in the media, and reviewers often distinguished Gosling, Ford, and Wright for further praise. Gosling's work was described as "superb, soulful", and he was considered physically convincing as a replicant in his expression and appearance. Meanwhile, critics from The Hollywood Reporter and from Empire magazine were among those who believed Ford worked a career-best performance. Other journalists, such as Peter Travers of Rolling Stone, viewed the two men as "double dynamite" in conversational scenes, in which the film assumes "a resonance that is both tragic and hopeful".

One particular point of contention in reviews of Blade Runner 2049 was characterization: some critics, for example, saw K's romance with Joi as an idea of unrealized potential because the film explores their relationship only superficially, so Joi never seems to develop into a fleshed-out character. Some criticized the film's depiction of its female characters as being too submissive.

The fate of K in the closing scenes of the film has been a matter of debate; some critics have suggested that his demise is open to interpretation, as it is not explicitly stated in the film that K has died. In an interview with Entertainment Weekly, screenwriter Michael Green expressed surprise that K's death had been called into question, referring to the use of the "Tears in rain" musical motif in the final scene.

The question of whether Deckard is a human or a replicant has been an ongoing controversy since the original release of Blade Runner. Ridley Scott has stated that Deckard was a replicant. Others, however, including Harrison Ford, disagree, and feel preserving the ambiguity of Deckard's status important to the film. Blade Runner 2049 does not settle this debate. During various physical struggles, Deckard showed no sign of artificial replicant strength; however, Gaff described Deckard to K as "retired"; and replicant maker Niander Wallace tells Deckard that "You are a wonder to me, Mr. Deckard", and that he might have been "designed" to fall in love with Rachael.

Rutger Hauer, who played Roy Batty in the original film, was critical of the sequel, saying, "In many ways, Blade Runner wasn't about the replicants, it was about what does it mean to be human? It's like E.T. But I'm not certain what the question was in the second Blade Runner. It's not a character-driven movie and there's no humor, there's no love, there's no soul. You can see the homage to the original. But that's not enough to me."

In 2025, the film ranked number 63 on the "Readers' Choice" edition of The New York Times' list of "The 100 Best Movies of the 21st Century."

=== Social commentary ===
Reviewing the film for Vice, Charlotte Gush was critical of its portrayal of women, who she said were "either prostitutes, holographic housewives" or victims dying brutal deaths. While acknowledging that "misogyny was part of the dystopia" in Scott's 1982 original, she stated that the sequel was "eye-gougingly sexist". Writing for The Guardian, Anna Smith expressed similar concerns, stating that "sexualised images of women dominate the stunning futuristic cityscapes". Sara Stewart of the New York Post entitled her review "You'll love the new Blade Runner—unless you're a woman".

Rachael Kaines of Moviepilot countered that "the gender politics in Blade Runner 2049 are intentional": "The movie is about secondary citizens. Replicants. Orphans. Women. Slaves. Just by depicting these secondary citizens in subjugation doesn't mean that it is supportive of these depictions – they are a condemnation."

Helen Lewis of the New Statesman suggested that the film is "an uneasy feminist parable about controlling the means of reproduction" and that "its villain, Niander Wallace, is consumed by rage that women can do something he cannot":

Fertility is the perfect theme for the dystopia of Blade Runner 2049 because of the western elite anxiety that over-educated, over-liberated women are having fewer children or choosing to opt-out of childbearing altogether. (One in five women is now childless by the age of 45; the rates are higher among women who have been to university.) Feminism is one potential solution to this problem: removing the barriers which make women feel that motherhood is a closing of doors. Another is to take flight and find another exploitable class to replace human females. ... Maybe androids don't dream of electric sheep, but some human men certainly dream of electric wombs.

In an interview with Vanity Fair, Denis Villeneuve responded that he is very sensitive about his portrayal of women: "Blade Runner is not about tomorrow; it's about today. And I'm sorry, but the world is not kind on women."

Quoting from viewer demographics for the film by Variety, Donald Clarke of The Irish Times indicated that female audiences seemed alienated from it, as just 35% of its audience was female.

Esquire magazine commented on the controversial aspects of the sex scene—involving K, the holographic Joi and replicant Mariette—calling it a "robo-ménage à trois", and contrasted it with the sex scene between Joaquin Phoenix and Scarlett Johansson in Her (2013).

Mackenzie Davis, who portrayed Mariette, argued for the self-awareness of the film's social commentary in an interview with the website Refinery29. Asked how she believed Blade Runner 2049 "differs [from Blade Runner] in its portrayal of women", Davis responded:

I think it's pretty self-aware about a pornographic economy that has reduced the roles of women to sheer consumption. The normalization of women's roles as things to be consumed, there's products that are made, just like there are now, the idea of the semi-sentient sex doll is really in line with what's going on in this Blade Runner universe, about having a thing that fulfills everything you want, but doesn't talk back and can't argue with you, but can be a loving, supporting companion and also fulfill all your sexual needs feels like something that's very contemporary and something the movie is very self-aware about. And then I think that there are female roles in different castes of this society that are able to be more embodied and powerful in conventional ways, and also have cracks in their facade where you see their vulnerabilities. But it seems like this world is so dependent on this caste system of humans perform these roles; replicants perform these roles, human superiors, creators, and those are the ways that women sort of travel between. But there isn't a lot of upward mobility.

Other outlets noted the film's depiction of environmental issues, the impacts of climate change and a wider ecocide. Science fiction author Matthew Kressel told the BBC that he thought "the environmental collapse the film so vividly depicts is not too far off from where we are today". Stills from the film were also compared to air pollution in Beijing and wildfire smoke in San Francisco and New York City.

=== Accolades ===
Blade Runner 2049 received numerous awards and nominations. At the 90th Academy Awards, it was nominated for five awards, winning Best Cinematography for Deakins, and Best Visual Effects for John Nelson, Gerd Nefzer, Paul Lambert, and Richard R. Hoover. At the 71st British Academy Film Awards, it received eight nominations, including Best Director, and won for Best Cinematography and Best Special Visual Effects. At the 23rd Critics' Choice Awards, the film was nominated for seven awards, winning for Best Cinematography.

== Future ==
=== Potential sequels ===
During the promotional tour for the 2015 film The Martian, Scott expressed interest in making additional Blade Runner films. In October 2017, Villeneuve said he expected a third film would be made if 2049 was successful. Fancher, who wrote both films, said he was considering reviving an old story idea involving Deckard traveling to another country. Ford has said he would be open to returning if he liked the script. In January 2018, Scott stated that he had "another [story] ready to evolve and be developed, [that] there is certainly one to be done for sure", referring to a third Blade Runner film.

In January 2020, Villeneuve expressed interest in "revisit[ing] this universe in a different way", making "something disconnected from both other movies", as opposed to a direct sequel.

=== Television series ===
In November 2021, Scott announced that a Blade Runner television series was in the works. In February 2022, it was announced that the series, Blade Runner 2099, was in development at Alcon Entertainment, Sony Pictures Television and Amazon Studios. It will be set fifty years after the events of 2049. Scott will serve as executive producer and potentially direct the series, while Silka Luisa will serve as showrunner. On October 12, 2022, it was reported that the series was officially approved and ready to move into production.

In April 2023, Joe Roberts writing for Slash Film announced progress for the planned filming and 2024 release of the limited series, stating, "We then learned, via BBC, that the show would film in Ireland, with Northern Ireland Screen chief executive Richard Williams confirming a spring 2023 start date. If that turns out to be the case, don't expect the series to make it to Prime Video in 2023. Filming will no doubt take months and if post-production is anything like you might expect on a big-budget sci-fi outing, we should prepare for "Blade Runner 2099" to debut sometime in 2024."

The series was getting ready to begin shooting in Belfast, when the production was postponed to 2024 due to the 2023 WGA strike. After the strike was over, the production ended up leaving Northern Ireland entirely. Roughly £1.5 million had been spent of £4.1 million awarded by the Northern Ireland Screen fund, but all money would be returned to the NI Screen fund upon the production's exit from the country. However, this left "a gap in Northern Ireland's production schedule" according to NI Screen fund's Chief Executive Richard Williams.

Blade Runner 2099 is scheduled to premiere on Amazon Prime Video on November 25, 2026.

=== Video game ===
In June 2023, Annapurna Interactive announced Blade Runner 2033: Labyrinth was in development. It is to be set before the events of the movie and after the anime Blade Runner: Black Lotus. However, following internal shake-ups at Annapurna, the game's steam page was delisted as well as removing mention of it from the Annapurna website. No official comment was provided.

== See also ==
- Total Recall 2070
- Artificial intelligence
- Cyberpunk
- List of adaptations of works by Philip K. Dick
- List of films featuring drones
