= Hampton Fancher =

American actor and director (born 1938)

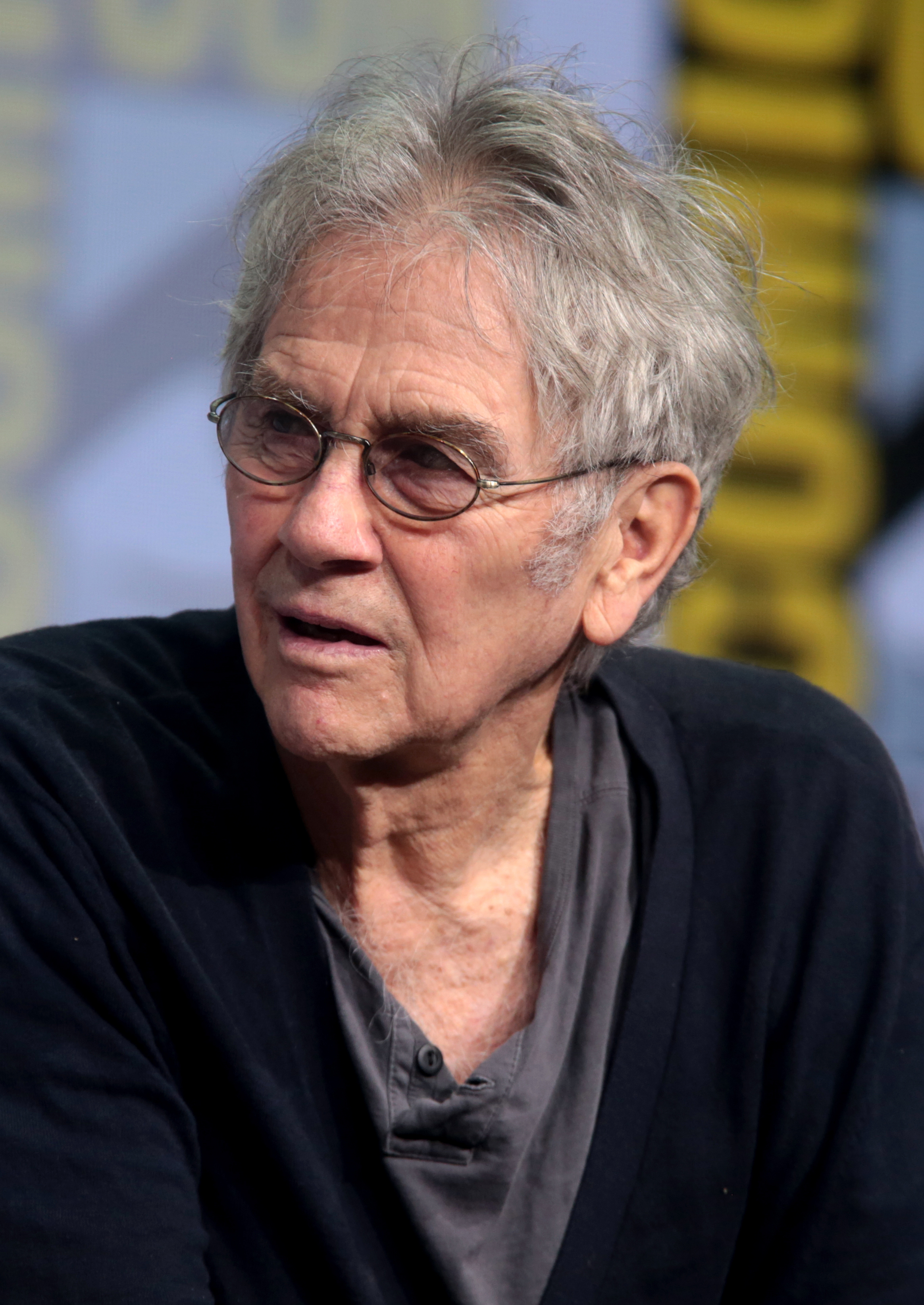
- Fancher in 2017
- Born: Hampton Lansden Fancher; July 18, 1938 (age 88); Los Angeles, California, U.S.
- Other name: Mario Montejo
- Occupations: Screenwriter; producer; actor; director
- Years active: 1958–present
- Known for: Blade Runner; Blade Runner 2049; The Minus Man
- Spouses: Joann McNabb (m. 1957; div. 1963) Sue Lyon (m. 1963; div. 1965)
- Awards: Montreal Special Grand Prize of the Jury

Hampton Lansden Fancher (born July 18, 1938) is an American actor, screenwriter, and filmmaker, who co-wrote the 1982 neo-noir science fiction film Blade Runner, based on the novel Do Androids Dream of Electric Sheep? by Philip K. Dick, and its 2017 sequel Blade Runner 2049. His 1999 directorial debut, The Minus Man, won the Special Grand Prize of the Jury at the Montreal World Film Festival.

== Early life ==
Fancher was born to a Mexican mother and an English-American father, a physician, in East Los Angeles, California. At 15, he ran away to Spain to become a flamenco dancer and renamed himself "Mario Montejo". Following the breakup of his marriage to Joann McNabb, he was married to Sue Lyon from 1963 to 1965.

== Career ==
In 1959, Fancher appeared in the episode "Misfits" of the ABC Western television series The Rebel.

Fancher played Deputy Lon Gillis in seven episodes of the ABC Western Black Saddle with Peter Breck. He guest-starred on other Westerns: Have Gun, Will Travel, Tate, Stagecoach West, Outlaws, Maverick (in the fourth-season episode "Last Stop: Oblivion"), Lawman, Temple Houston, Cheyenne (1961 episode "Incident at Dawson Flats"), and also Bonanza (1966 episode "A Dollar's Worth of Trouble"). In 1967, Fancher guest-starred on Mannix in the episode “Turn Every Stone.”

Fancher appeared in two Troy Donahue films, 1961's Parrish and 1962's Rome Adventure, and was cast as Larry Wilson in the 1963 episode "Little Richard" of the CBS anthology series GE True, hosted by Jack Webb. In 1965, he played the role of Hamp Fisher in the Perry Mason episode "The Case of the Silent Six".

Fancher acted in more than 50 movies and television shows. During this time, he had relationships with several women, including Barbara Hershey and Teri Garr. Although he showed interest in screenwriting, it took until 1977 for Fancher to move fully into it. He continues to act occasionally.

After trying to option Philip K. Dick's 1968 science fiction novel Do Androids Dream of Electric Sheep? in 1975, and unable to secure the rights, Fancher sent his friend Brian Kelly, a prospective film producer, to negotiate with Dick. Dick agreed, and Fancher was brought on to write a screenplay before Kelly would later enlist the support of producer Michael Deeley. This made Fancher the executive producer, which led to disagreements with eventual director Ridley Scott, who then brought in David Peoples to continue reworking the script. Scott and Fancher had already clashed concerning the movie, as Scott felt the original script did not sufficiently explore the world of the movie, choosing instead to focus on the interior drama. Fancher's rewriting process was too slow for the production crew, which nicknamed him "Happen Faster". The movie was ultimately filmed and released as Blade Runner (1982).

Fancher wrote two films following Blade Runner. The Mighty Quinn (1989) starred Denzel Washington and The Minus Man (1999) starred Owen Wilson. Fancher also directed the latter. He wrote the story and co-wrote, with Michael Green, the screenplay for Blade Runner 2049 (2017), a sequel to the 1982 film.

In the early 1980s, Fancher lived outside of Los Angeles in Topanga Canyon. Fancher appeared in a cameo role in the independent film Tonight at Noon (2009), directed by Michael Almereyda and starring Rutger Hauer.

In 2019, Fancher published The Wall Will Tell You, a screenwriting manual which drew from his personal experiences.

Fancher provided voiceover commentary for The Criterion Collection edition DVD extras of the film noir adaptations of Ernest Hemingway's short story "The Killers", which included the 1946, 1956 and 1964 versions.

== In popular culture ==
Fancher's life was the subject of Escapes, a documentary directed by Michael Almereyda and executive-produced by Wes Anderson.

== Filmography ==
=== Film ===
Year	Title	Role	Notes
1958	The Brain Eaters	Zombie (uncredited)	
1961	Parrish	Edgar Raike	
1962	Rome Adventure	Albert Stillwell	
1965	The Incredible Sex Revolution	Harold Morton	
1970	Mir hat es immer Spaß gemacht	Gino	
1975	The Other Side of the Mountain	Lee Zadroga	
1976	Survive!	Hampton	
1982	Blade Runner		Writer and executive producer
1989	The Mighty Quinn		Writer
1999	The Minus Man		Director and writer
2005	Men's League	Unknown cameo	Short film
2009	Tonight at Noon	Himself	Cameo appearance
2010	Hands & Eyes	The Art Critic	Short film
2017	2036: Nexus Dawn		Writer, short films
2017	2048: Nowhere to Run		Writer, short films
2017	Blade Runner 2049		Writer

== Television ==
Year(s)	Title	Role(s)	Notes
1958-1960	Have Gun - Will Travel	Ben Dawes / Beau Crommer / Keith Loring	3 episodes
1959	Zane Grey Theater	Linc	Episode ''Deadfall''
1959	Alcoa Presents: One Step Beyond	Tim Plunkett	Episode ''The Burning Girl''
1959	The D.A.'s Man	Danny Wilder	Episode ''Out of Town''
1959	The Lineup	Rivers	Episode ''Wake Up to Terror''
1959	Law of the Plainsman	Harver	Episode ''A Matter of Life and Death''
1959	The Rebel	Bull	Episode ''Misfits''
1959-1960	Black Saddle	Orv Tibbett / Deputy Gillis / Lon Gillis	7 episodes
1959-1965	Gunsmoke	Gunman / Dunc Hedgepeth / Clem / Milton Clum	4 episodes
1960	The Detectives	Frankie	Episode ''Time and Tide''
1960	Father Knows Best	Rudy Kissler	Episode ''Blind Date''
1960	Tate	Coley	Episode ''Quiet After the Storm''
1960	Outlaws	Mike Duane	Episode ''Shorty''
1961	Cheyenne	Jasper Dawson	Episode ''Incident at Dawson Flats''
1961	The Best of the Post	Urknown	Episode ''Frontier Correspondent''
1961	Stagecoach West	Adam	Episode ''Not in Our Stars''
1961	Maverick	Tate McKenna	Episode ''Last Stop: Oblivion''
1961	Lawman	Lester Beason	Episode ''Conditional Surrender''
1961	The Rifleman	Corey Hazlitt	Episode ''The Decision''
1962-1964	Rawhide	Billy Hobson / Jake Hammerklein	3 episodes
1963	GE True	Larry Wilson	Episode ''Little Richard''
1963	Temple Houston	Jim Stocker	Episode ''The Third Bullet''
1963	Death Valley Days	Ned Murphy	Episode ''The Red Ghost of Eagle Creek''
1963-1964	77 Sunset Strip	Len / Chuck Gates Jr.	2 episodes
1964	The Great Adventure	Fleming	Episode ''Rodger Young''
1964	Arrest and Trial	Raymond	Episode ''Somewhat Lower Than the Angels''
1965	Perry Mason	Hamp Fisher	Episode ''The Case of the Silent Six"
1966	The Fugitive	Homer	Episode ''The 2130''
1966	Bonanza	Craig Bonner	Episode ''A Dollar's Worth of Trouble''
1966	The Road West	Gray Yeater	Episode ''Piece of Tin''
1966	The Monroes	Carl Goff	Episode ''Silent Night, Deadly Night''
1967	Daniel Boone	Tad Arlen / Lieutenant Noland	2 episodes
1967-1972	Mannix	Cornwall Dover / Carl Loder (uncredited)	2 episodes
1969	Romeo und Julia '70	Romeo Müller, Taxichauffeur	Mini-Series; 2 episodes
1969-1972	Adam-12	Philip Bartell / Ray	2 episodes
1973	Of Men and Women	Himself	Unsold pilot Segment ''The Interview''
1974	Get Christie Love!	Rod	Episode ''Get Christie Love!''
1974	The Stranger Who Looks Like Me	Adoptive Parent #3	TV movie
1976	Switch	Jeff Louden	Episode ''Pirates of Tin Pan Alley''
1976	The Blue Knight	Guss Fermin	Episode ''Bull's Eye''
1977	Police Story	Pike Harriman	Episode ''One of Our Cops Is Crazy''
1978	Last of the Good Guys	Officer George Talltree (uncredited)	TV movie
