= Luke Scott (director) =

English director (born 1968)

- Born: Luke James L. Scott; 1 May 1968 (age 58); London, England
- Occupation: Director
- Years active: 1993–present
- Father: Ridley Scott
- Relatives: Jake Scott (brother); Jordan Scott (paternal half-sister); Tony Scott (paternal uncle)

Luke James L. Scott (born 1 May 1968) is a British film, commercial, and television director. He was the second unit director on Exodus: Gods and Kings (2014), The Martian (2015), Alien: Covenant (2017), and Gladiator II (2024), all directed by his father, Ridley Scott. He made his feature film directorial debut in 2016 with Morgan.

== Career ==
In 2014, Scott worked as a second unit director on his father's biblical epic film Exodus: Gods and Kings, which starred Christian Bale and Joel Edgerton. The film was released on 12 December 2014 by 20th Century Fox, grossing $268 million with a budget of $140 million. Scott worked as second unit director again with his father on The Martian (2015), Alien: Covenant (2017), and Gladiator II (2024).

Scott made his feature film directorial debut on the science fiction thriller Morgan. His father Ridley produced the film. Morgan starred Kate Mara, and was released by 20th Century Fox in September 2016. In February 2017, 20th Century Fox released the Alien: Covenant prologue short film entitled Last Supper directed by Scott in collaboration with the design consultant firm 3AM.

== Personal life ==
Luke is the son of director-producer Sir Ridley Scott and Felicity Heywood, and brother of Jake Scott and half-brother of Jordan Scott, both also directors.

== Filmography ==
As director

Year	Title	Notes
1999	The Hunger	Episode: "Skin Deep"
2012	Loom	Short film
2012	TED 2023	Short film
2016	Morgan	Feature directing debut
2017	2036: Nexus Dawn	Blade Runner 2049 short film
2017	2048: Nowhere to Run	Blade Runner 2049 short film
2017	Prologue: Last Supper	Alien: Covenant short film
2017	Meet Walter	Alien: Covenant short film
2017	She Won't Go Quietly	Alien: Covenant short film
2020	Raised by Wolves	3 episodes

Second unit director

- Exodus: Gods and Kings (2014)
- The Martian (2015)
- Alien: Covenant (2017)
- Gladiator II (2024)

Art director

- 1492: Conquest of Paradise (1992)
