= 2048: Nowhere to Run =

2017 American sci-fi short film

- Directed by: Luke Scott
- Written by: Hampton Fancher; Michael Green
- Starring: Dave Bautista; Gerard Miller
- Production companies: Alcon Entertainment; Columbia Pictures; Thunderbird Entertainment; Scott Free Productions
- Distributed by: Warner Bros. Pictures (North America); Sony Pictures Releasing International (International)
- Release date: September 16, 2017 (United States)
- Running time: 6 minutes
- Country: United States
- Language: English

2048: Nowhere to Run (known in China and Taiwan as 2048: No Escape or 2048: Nowhere to Escape; alternatively known as Blade Runner 2048) is a 2017 American tech noir short film acting as a prequel to the feature film Blade Runner 2049 and the sequel to the short film 2036: Nexus Dawn. It is one of three such prequels, alongside Blade Runner Black Out 2022 and 2036: Nexus Dawn. The short was released on September 16, 2017, approximately three weeks before the release of the feature film, and features Dave Bautista as Blade Runner 2049 character Sapper Morton, alongside Orion Ben. The film was written by Hampton Fancher and Michael Green, who also wrote the feature film, and directed by Luke Scott, whose father Ridley Scott directed the original Blade Runner and is executive producer on the sequel Blade Runner 2049.

The film takes place in Los Angeles in 2048, one year before the events of Blade Runner 2049, and tells the story of Morton protecting a mother and daughter from thugs, ultimately leading to his status as a replicant being reported.

== Plot ==
In Los Angeles, in 2048, Sapper Morton is shown weeping hysterically into a mirror, struggling with his past traumas. He washes his face in a sink and puts on his glasses. Walking through a crowded street, he is briefly accosted by a group of thugs, whom he ignores. Greeted by Ella, he gives her the book The Power and the Glory to read, a book that he enjoyed. Leaving, Sapper goes to a market to sell leeches he has farmed, being paid $3,000, which is $1,000 less than Sapper needs. After leaving the market, Sapper sees Ella and her mother about to be sexually assaulted by the group of thugs he had earlier ignored. Angered, Sapper proceeds to savagely beat the group and kills most of them, demonstrating superhuman strength and endurance in the process. Seeing Ella and her mother terrified at the violence, a remorseful Sapper leaves the scene, having dropped his identification papers. A spectator, having watched Sapper earlier, calls the LAPD to inform them that he thinks he has found a rogue "skin-job".

=== Chinese prologue ===
The Chinese version of the film features a text-based prologue. The text explains that replicant production had been banned after "The Blackout" in 2022, leading to the bankruptcy of the Tyrell Corporation. Earth's ecosystem has been on the brink of collapse since the mid-2020s. Niander Wallace, the blind CEO of the Wallace Corporation, is explained to have acquired the Tyrell Corporation and begun to develop a new generation of replicants to serve as slaves to help rebuild the Earth's environment. This prologue previously appeared before the Chinese version of the Blade Runner short film 2036: Nexus Dawn.

== Cast ==
- Dave Bautista as Sapper Morton, a Nexus-8 replicant.
- Gerard Miller as Salt
- Gaia Ottman as Ella
- Björn Freiberg as spectator
- Orion Ben as Ella's mother
- Adam Savage as shop patron (cameo)

== Release ==
On August 29, 2017, it was announced that Denis Villeneuve had selected various filmmakers to direct three short films exploring incidents that occurred between the events of Blade Runner and Blade Runner 2049. The second film, 2048: Nowhere to Run is directed by Luke Scott, and follows Nexus-8 replicant Sapper Morton as he protects a mother and daughter from thugs. Scott previously directed 2036: Nexus Dawn.

== Reception ==
2048: Nowhere to Run was met with appreciation for providing Dave Bautista with a role worthy of his talents.

== See also ==
- Artificial intelligence
- List of adaptations of works by Philip K. Dick
