= List of Odd Mom Out episodes =

Odd Mom Out is an American comedy television series that premiered on June 8, 2015, on Bravo. Based on the novel Momzillas, Odd Mom Out was created by and stars Jill Kargman as a fictionalized version of herself named Jill Weber, who is forced to navigate the wealthy mommy clique that resides in New York’s prestigious Upper East Side neighborhood. Andy Buckley, KK Glick, Sean Kleier, Joanna Cassidy, and Abby Elliott also co-star in the series.

On September 22, 2016, the network renewed Odd Mom Out for a 10-episode third season shortly after the second season concluded.

As of September 13, 2017, a total of 30 episodes of Odd Mom Out have aired.

== Series overview ==
Season	Episodes	Originally released	
Season	Episodes	First released	Last released
1	10	June 8, 2015	August 3, 2015
2	10	June 20, 2016	August 29, 2016
3	10	July 12, 2017	September 13, 2017

== Episodes ==
=== Season 1 (2015) ===
No. overall	No. in season	Title	Directed by	Written by	Original release date	U.S. viewers (millions)
1	1	"Wheels Up"	Andy Fleming	Jill Kargman and Julie Rottenberg & Elisa Zuritsky	June 8, 2015	0.86
Andy, Jill's husband, gets intimidated by his brother's success. Jill tries to find the best school for their children. Brooke, Jill's sister-in-law, asks her to come to her charity event.
2	2	"Vons Have More Fun"	Andy Fleming	Julie Rottenberg & Elisa Zuritsky	June 8, 2015	0.60
Jill and Andy learn about their ancestors. Jill's best friend, Vanessa, finds a boyfriend. Jill is pressured by Brooke and Candace to take an advantage of having royal antecedents.
3	3	"Dying to Get In"	Andy Fleming	Jill Kargman	June 15, 2015	0.59
Jill gets frustrated about finding the right kindergarten for her children. Andy's mother wants the family to go for an interview to get in a very special and prestigious cemetery.
4	4	"Omakase"	John Fortenberry	Will Graham	June 22, 2015	0.67
Jill invites a new friend to a trendy restaurant, they run into Brooke and Lex.
5	5	"Brooklandia"	Jeff Melman	Julie Rottenberg & Elisa Zuritsky	June 29, 2015	0.64
Jill falls in love with down-to-earth moms in attendance at a friends backyard party in Brooklyn.
6	6	"Midwife Crisis"	Jeff Melman	Julie Rottenberg & Elisa Zuritsky	July 6, 2015	0.74
Jill must rely on her wits when Brooke goes into labor but cannot make it into her chosen hospital.
7	7	"Sip 'N See"	Michael LaHaie	Julie Kraut	July 13, 2015	0.60
Jill reluctantly throws a "sip 'n' see" party to give everyone a chance to meet Brooke's baby.
8	8	"Staffing Up"	John Fortenberry	Steve Rubinshteyn	July 20, 2015	0.64
Brooke and Jill go to a children's museum to observe nannies in their natural habitat.
9	9	"The Truth Fairy"	Tamra Davis	Angie Day	July 27, 2015	0.59
Jill starts hanging out with the momzillas and her and Vanessa become distant. While they try to find who is telling the children crazy things about the world.
10	10	"Wheels Down"	Tamra Davis	Jill Kargman and Julie Rottenberg & Elisa Zuritsky	August 3, 2015	0.67
Everything comes to a head at Brooke's NACHO ball.

=== Season 2 (2016) ===
No. overall	No. in season	Title	Directed by	Written by	Original release date	U.S. viewers (millions)
11	1	"The High Road"	Alex Reid	Jill Kargman and Julie Rottenberg & Elisa Zuritsky	June 20, 2016	0.66
Jill dips her toe back in the work world by visiting the fashion magazine where she used to work. But her excitement at being welcomed back with open arms is short-lived.
12	2	"Fasting and Furious"	Alex Reid	Julie Rottenberg & Elisa Zuritsky	June 27, 2016 (Note: "Episodes two and three of season two were released online on June 20, 2016, the same day of the season two premiere.)	0.57
It's Yom Kippur and Jill's parents (Blythe Danner, Dan Hedaya) come to town - to atone, and to take care of a matter of life and death.
13	3	"Hamming It Up"	Alex Reid	Julie Kraut	July 11, 2016	0.59
Jill and Vanessa - tired of being the last people on Earth not to have seen Hamilton - go on a desperate quest to get tickets in time for Lin Manuel Miranda's last performance. Several of the Broadway show's cast members appear in cameo roles, including Jasmine Cephas Jones and Javier Munoz.
14	4	"Crushed"	Peter Lauer	Will Graham	July 11, 2016	0.50
Jill is pushed to get a drivers license. Brooke celebrates the opening of her store.
15	5	"The O.D.D. Couple"	Peter Lauer	Jill Kargman and Julie Rottenberg & Elisa Zuritsky	July 18, 2016	0.73
A therapist (Meredith Vieira) diagnoses Miles with an attention disorder, forcing Jill and Andy to take sides. Brooke wrestles with her resurfacing feelings for Lex.
16	6	"Knock of Shame"	Peter Lauer	Max Werner	July 25, 2016	0.56
Jill and Andy meet their dream neighbors (Drew Barrymore, John Hodgman), but are immediately disillusioned with them. Brooke and Lex are trapped in the Waldorf during a blizzard.
17	7	"Hanoi Jill"	Alex Reid	Angie Day	August 1, 2016	0.66
In order to celebrate Brooke and Lex reuniting, Andy and Jill are invited to brunch at Candace's. Andy and Jill are caught up in the doorman strike.
18	8	"40 Is the New 70"	Michael LaHaie	Julie Rottenberg & Elisa Zuritsky	August 15, 2016	0.65
Jill, Andy, and Vanessa feel the sting of aging. Brooke and Lex invite Jill and Andy to an enlightening "Dinner in the Dark".
19	9	"The Hamptons"	Gail Lerner	Jill Kargman and Julie Rottenberg & Elisa Zuritsky	August 22, 2016	0.69
During a traffic jam on the way to the Hamptons, Jill has a nasty run-in with Joy Green (Molly Ringwald), Brooke's idol and author of "The Joy Manifesto". Candace's white party takes a sharp turn for Brooke.
20	10	"Ode to Joy"	Gail Lerner	Jill Kargman and Julie Rottenberg & Elisa Zuritsky	August 29, 2016	0.78
Jill struggles with telling Brooke that Joy Green is a monster. A sudden disaster shakes the family to its very core.

=== Season 3 (2017) ===
No. overall	No. in season	Title	Directed by	Written by	Original release date	U.S. viewers (millions)
21	1	"Frisky Business"	Peter Lauer	Jill Kargman & Lara Spotts	July 12, 2017	0.57
Jill and Andy are worried that Hazel has grown up overnight when they visit her at sleepaway camp. The residents of the Upper East Side deal with their new financial situations.
22	2	"Candle in the Windbag"	Alex Reid	Jill Kargman & Lara Spotts	July 19, 2017	0.58
Since Candace moved in with the Webers, Jill has been driven to her wit's end. Vanessa tries to spice up her long distance relationship with Graham.
23	3	"M.F.A. in B.S."	Alex Reid	Ally Musika	July 26, 2017	0.62
Jill adjusts to the new art scene at her show. Lex struggles to find out who he is after losing his job.
24	4	"Children in the Corn Pudding"	Alex Reid	Lindsey Stoddard	August 2, 2017	0.59
After spending a Thanksgiving in the suburbs with Brooke's sisters Barrett (Christine Taylor) and Berkley (Meredith Hagner), Jill realizes why Brooke is the way she is. Vanessa must tend to her building after accidentally revealing that she's a doctor.
25	5	"Jury Doody"	Michael LaHaie	Jill Kargman & Lara Spotts	August 9, 2017	0.53
Jill is riddled with guilt after Candace returns from jury duty and tells the family the lurid details of her cruise ship murder trial.
26	6	"Dadderall"	Michael LaHaie	Ally Musika	August 16, 2017	0.54
Faced with an impossible work deadline on the night of his Dad's Committee Night Out, Andy ends up using stimulants. Meanwhile, Jill and Vanessa learn the cruel definition of Med Spa when they visit their college friend at his new venture.
27	7	"Weber M.D."	Alex Reid	Jill Kargman & Lara Spotts	August 23, 2017	0.46
By day, Jill shoots Brooke's new line of Von Weber wares, and by night, she and Vanessa investigate a rash of infections plaguing the Upper "Yeast" Side. Whilst, Candace seeks answers for why she keeps getting called "Candy Ass."
28	8	"Star Grazing"	Peter Lauer	Ally Musika	August 30, 2017	0.42
When Jill books a photo shoot in LA, she brings Vanessa along and they follow musician Dave Navarro on a crazy adventure. Candace oversteps her boundaries with Hazel, and Lex faces his deepest fears in a zero-gravity chamber.
29	9	"Homo Erectus"	Peter Lauer	Lindsey Stoddart	September 6, 2017	0.40
Animal instincts take over during the annual sleep-over at the natural history museum; Brooke has cold feet about Lex going to Mars; Simone reveals her true love; Vanessa surprises herself; Andy realizes he's been chasing the wrong woman all year.
30	10	"Blood Bath"	Peter Lauer	Jill Kargman & Lara Spotts	September 13, 2017	0.42
The Weber and von Weber families are thrown into a tizzy when Hazel gets her period, but that's nothing compared with what happens when someone from their past appears on 'The Wendy Williams Show'.
