= Kargman =

Kargman is a surname. Notable people with the surname include:

- Harry Kargman, founder and CEO of Kargo, husband of Jill
- Jill Kargman, American author, writer and actress, wife of Harry
- Yisrael Kargman, Israeli politician
