= Arie L. Kopelman =

American businessman (1938–2024)

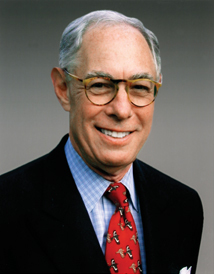
- Kopelman in 2005
- Born: September 23, 1938; Brookline, Massachusetts, U.S.
- Died: October 7, 2024 (aged 86); New York City, U.S.
- Education: Johns Hopkins University (BA); Columbia University (MBA)
- Occupation: Businessman
- Title: President and COO, Chanel
- Term: 1986–2004
- Spouse: Coco Kopelman
- Children: 2, including Jill

Arie Leonard Kopelman (September 23, 1938 – October 7, 2024) was an American businessman and philanthropist. He served as the President and COO of Chanel from 1986 until 2004, when he retired and was succeeded by former Banana Republic President Maureen Chiquet. He remained at Chanel as Vice Chairman of the Board until 2008.

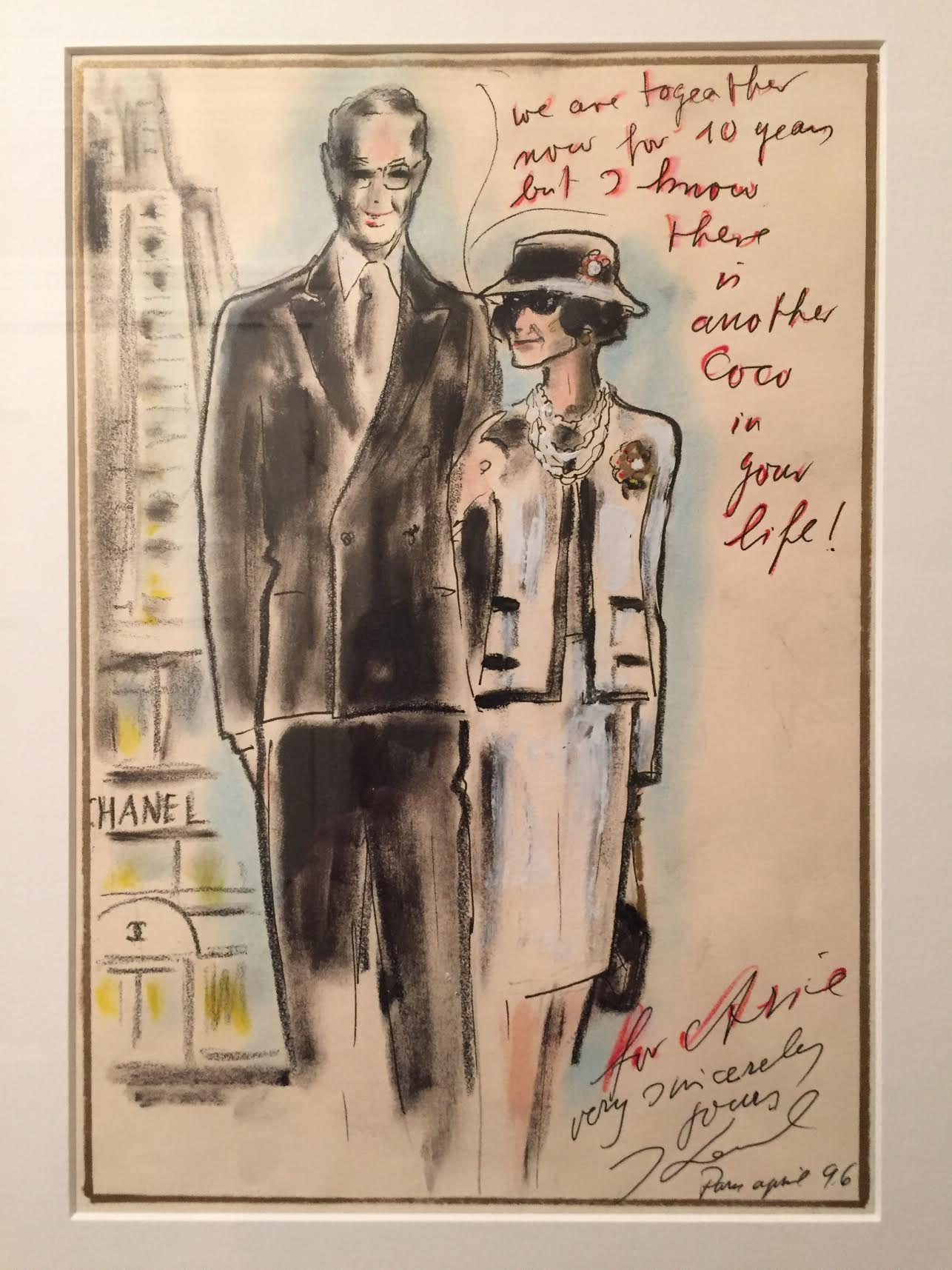
Portrait of Kopelman and Coco Chanel, painted by Karl Lagerfeld at their 10-year anniversary of working together, 1996.

== Life and career ==
Kopelman was born on September 23, 1938, in Brookline, Massachusetts, to Jewish parents, Frank and Ruth Kopelman. Frank Kopelman, a Harvard Law School graduate whose family emigrated from Lithuania, practiced law, was a professor at Boston University, and was the youngest judge appointed in the state's history when he was appointed to a judgeship in Boston. Arie Kopelman's twin brother, David Kopelman, followed in the footsteps of their father, attended Harvard for his undergraduate and law degrees, and went on to become a judge.

After attending The Boston Latin School and the Williston Northampton School, Kopelman completed his undergraduate studies at Johns Hopkins University and received an MBA from Columbia Business School. His first job after business school was working in the training program at Procter & Gamble at their headquarters in Cincinnati, Ohio. After three years at the company, he became an account executive at the advertising firm Doyle Dane Bernbach (also called DDB Worldwide), where over the next 20 years he ascended the ranks to become Vice Chairman and then the General Manager. During his tenure at DDB Worldwide, Kopelman worked with clients including JB Liquors, Heinz Ketchup, and Chanel, which was one of his largest accounts.

In 1985, the owners of Chanel, Alain Wertheimer and Gérard Wertheimer, hired Kopelman as Chanel Inc.'s president and chief operating officer at their headquarters in New York City. At that point, Kopelman already had a 14-year-long working relationship with Chanel through DDB, where he had crafted advertising campaigns for the brand. Over the next 19 years at Chanel, Kopelman grew the brand to expand its core retail, fragrance, cosmetics, skin care, eyewear, and accessories businesses, transforming Chanel into a company earning multi-billion dollar revenues. At the outset of Kopelman's career with Chanel, the brand had two standalone boutiques and its annual revenue was reported at $357 million. By the time of his retirement, there were 17 brick-and-mortar boutiques just in the United States and in 2014, Chanel reported annual sales in the area of $7 billion.

During his tenure as president, the company released the fragrances Coco, Coco Mademoiselle, Chance, Allure, Allure for Men, Cristalle, Egoiste, and Egoiste Platinum. Coco Mademoiselle is often ranked among the world's best-selling fragrances. Kopelman was in charge of brand strategy for Chanel No. 5. As such, he put together its five-year multi-platform endorsement deal with Nicole Kidman as the face of the perfume, for which the director Baz Luhrmann created television advertisements.

=== Personal life and death ===
Kopelman was married to Corinne "Coco" Franco. Coco, whose father was a businessman of Greek descent and whose mother was French, is from a Sephardic Jewish family.

The couple had two children, New York Times bestselling author, actress, and creator of the show Odd Mom Out, Jill Kargman (married to American businessman Harry Kargman), and Will Kopelman, a private art advisor who is married to Vogue editor Alexandra Michler, and was previously married to actress Drew Barrymore. Kopelman and Franco had six grandchildren. They lived on the Upper East Side of Manhattan in New York City and additionally had a home together in Nantucket.

Kopelman died from pancreatic cancer at home in Manhattan on October 7, 2024, at the age of 86.

== Philanthropy and awards ==
Kopelman was a member of several civic and charitable organizations in New York and the United States. In January 1989, Kopelman was appointed by President Ronald Reagan to the United States Holocaust Memorial Council.

Kopelman was the recipient of the Fragrance Foundation (FiFi) Hall of Fame Award in 2005, and was awarded three CFDA awards. In 2000, he was awarded the "Living Landmark" award by the New York Landmarks Conservancy.

From 1994 through 2017, Kopelman held the position of chairman of the Winter Antiques Show in New York City. He is credited with turning the show around by adding new leadership and infrastructure, and bringing new dealers into the fold.

Additionally, Kopelman served on the Board of Overseers for Columbia Business School, as well as on the board of the St. Bernard's School for Boys in New York City, the Municipal Art Society, and East Side Settlement House. He was the president of the board of the Nantucket Historical Association, who named a gallery in his honor after his passing. He was a founding board member of the Upper East Side Historic District, the president of admissions of the Century Country Club, served on the board of directors of the Heinz Awards, and on the board of The New York City School of American Ballet. Kopelman's wife attended the school as a child, and there is now a studio there named after Kopelman.
