= Harry Kargman =

American entrepreneur (born 1974)

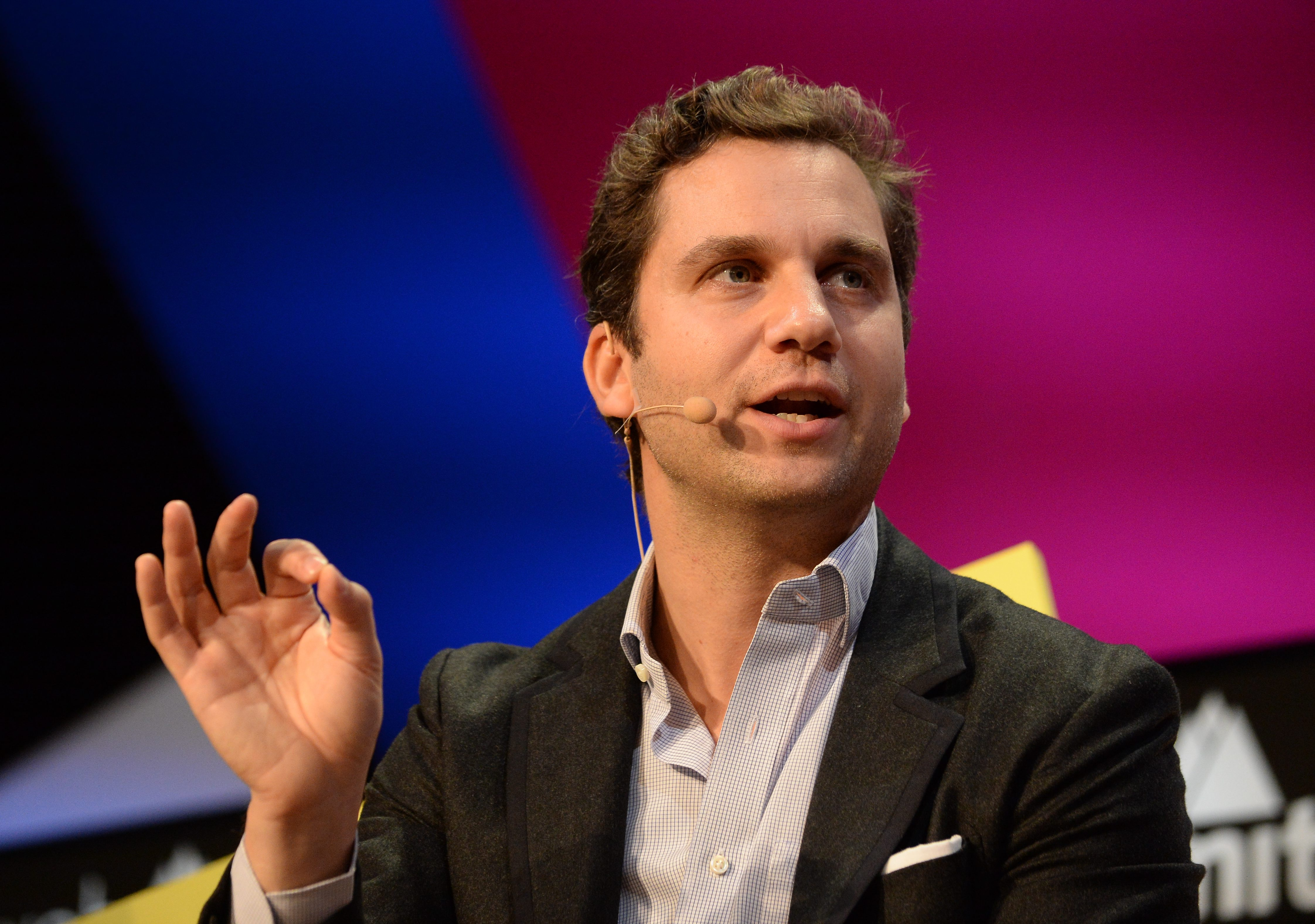
- Kargman in 2015
- Born: July 29, 1974 (age 51)
- Education: Harvard University
- Occupations: Founder & CEO of Kargo Global, Inc.
- Spouse: Jill Kargman
- Children: 3
- Relatives: Arie L. Kopelman (father-in-law); Will Kopelman (brother-in-law); Bess Kargman (sister)

Harry Kargman (born July 29, 1974) is an American entrepreneur. Kargman is founder and CEO of Kargo Global, Inc., a firm that manages mobile brand advertising for many media companies including CBS Interactive, Hearst, The Daily Mail, Meredith, Scripps, Target Corporation, T-Mobile, Vice, and Vox. Kargman holds numerous patents and is a member of Ad Council's Board of Directors.

== Early life and career ==
Kargman grew up in the greater Boston area and graduated from the private all-boys school, Belmont Hill School, in 1992. In 1997, Kargman graduated with honors from Harvard University with a bachelor's degree in Computer Science and Government. He has two sisters, Bess, a filmmaker and director of 2011 film First Position, and Sophie Kargman, an actress.

Before starting his own company, he worked at Intel and Intertainer, a broadband content provider.

== Kargo ==
=== Kargo Inc. ===
Kargman initially founded Kargo Inc. in 1999, hoping to build software that would serve as the mobile web's foundation. Mobile carriers, to whom he offered his services, insisted on many rounds of vetting and trial periods before they would purchase his software. At this stage, his company had much venture capital funding but little revenue and the company went through all of its money in 2001. That year, Kargo lost its office and staff dropped from 35 to just Kargman and two engineers.

However, because the company was Tribeca-based and within the 9/11 impact zone, Kargo received approximately $70,000 from New York City's World Trade Center Business Recovery Grant Program, which kept it afloat. With this grant, Kargman aimed to rebuild the company - but this time without venture capital funds.

=== Kargo Global, Inc. ===
In 2003, Kargman created Kargo Inc.'s successor: Kargo Global, Inc., and he transferred Kargo Inc.'s trademark to it. While rebuilding Kargo, he pivoted the role of the company's relationship with mobile carriers. Instead of creating software for mobile carriers for single payments, he created sites where carriers could sell products - such as ringtones - and Kargo could share the revenue from every sale.

As the Internet shifted, Kargo shifted again, now building websites for media companies rather than just their portals. However, Kargo found media companies to be reluctant because they were not sure they would be able to monetize the sites. So, after watching media companies be unable to sell mobile adds for several years, Kargman decided to move Kargo into the ad business. Kargo began contracting with networks such as AdMob and Millennial Media, placing ads on sites rather than merely relying on sites' publishers to do so.

Kargo's annual revenue in 2015 was $100 million. Kargo has locations in New York City, Chicago, Los Angeles, San Francisco, Detroit, Dallas, Sydney, and Auckland.

== Kargo awards ==
Kargo has received several awards, including:

- Mobile Marketing Association (MMA) Smarties Gold Medal, Cross-Mobile Integration, Lyft - 2018
- MMA Smarties Gold Medal, Social Impact, Lyft - 2018
- MMA Smarties Silver Medal, Mobile Video, Lyft - 2018
- Inc. 5000 - 2015-2018
- Crain's New York Business Fast 50 - 2015-2017
- Deloitte Technology Fast 500 - 2016, 2017
- Great Place to Work - 2017
- Business Insider's 37 Hottest Pre-IPO Ad Tech Startups - 2016
- OMMA Award for Best Rich Media Display: Single Execution, Unilever/Magnum - 2014
- OMMA Award for Best Online Advertising Creativity - 2014

== Personal awards and honors ==
Kargman has been a guest on programs including CNBC, Fox News, Bloomberg, 20/20, NPR, and The Today Show and has been featured in publications including The New York Times, AdAge, Adweek, Business Insider, and The Wall Street Journal.

Adweek named Kargman an Innovative Mobile Ad Player in 2017 and City & State named Kargman as one of the 2016 recipients of its Responsible 100 award, which it gives to New York executives and leaders that embody the values of the core principles of corporate social responsibility.

Kargman was also named Ernst & Young Entrepreneur of the Year 2016 New York in the Advertising Technology category and one of Business Insider's Silicon Alley 100 in 2014.

== Personal life ==
Kargman married author, writer, and actress Jill Kargman, star of Odd Mom Out, in 2002. The two were set up by their grandmothers. The couple has three children: Sadie, Ivy, and Fletch.

He is the son-in-law of Arie L. Kopelman, former president of Chanel, and the brother-in-law of Will Kopelman.
