= Joanna Cassidy =

American actress

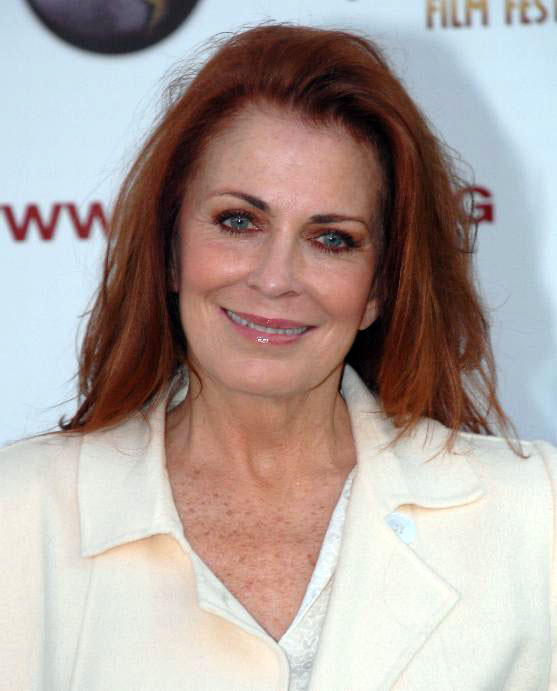
- Cassidy in 2007
- Born: Joanna Virginia Caskey; August 2, 1945 (age 81); Camden, New Jersey, U.S.
- Education: Syracuse University (BFA)
- Occupation: Actress
- Years active: 1968–present
- Spouse: Kennard C. Kobrin (m. 1964; div. 1974)
- Partner: Alan Hamel (2025–present)
- Children: 2

Joanna Cassidy (born Joanna Virginia Caskey; August 2, 1945) is an American actress and former model. She began working as a model in the 1960s and made her professional acting debut in 1973, appearing in the thriller films The Laughing Policeman and The Outfit. She later starred in the films Bank Shot (1974) and The Late Show (1977), the short-lived television series The Roller Girls (1978), and 240-Robert (1979). In 1982, she played replicant Zhora Salome in the science-fiction film Blade Runner.

Cassidy starred in the political thriller film Under Fire (1983), winning a Sant Jordi Award for Best Actress in a Foreign Language Film and received a nomination for the National Society of Film Critics Award for Best Actress. From 1983 to 1984, she starred opposite Dabney Coleman in the NBC comedy series Buffalo Bill, for which she received a Golden Globe Award and was nominated for a Primetime Emmy Award for Outstanding Lead Actress in a Comedy Series. She later starred in films The Fourth Protocol (1987), Who Framed Roger Rabbit (1988) for which she received a Saturn Award nomination, The Package (1989), Where the Heart Is (1990), Don't Tell Mom the Babysitter's Dead (1991), Vampire in Brooklyn (1995), and Ghosts of Mars (2001).

Cassidy also starred in a number of made-for-television movies and miniseries, including Hollywood Wives (1983), Invitation to Hell (1984), Barbarians at the Gate (1993), and The Tommyknockers (1993). From 2001 to 2005, she played Margaret Chenowith on the HBO drama series Six Feet Under, for which she received both Primetime Emmy Award and Screen Actors Guild Award nominations for her supporting turn on the hit series. From 2011 to 2013, she played Joan Hunt on the ABC series Body of Proof, and from 2010 to 2013 starred in the HBO Canada comedy series Call Me Fitz, for which she won two Canadian Screen Awards, as well as a nomination for a Gemini Award.

== Biography ==
Cassidy was born Joanna Virginia Caskey in Camden, New Jersey, across the Delaware River from Philadelphia, the daughter of Virginia and Joe Caskey. She was raised in Haddonfield, and attended Haddonfield Memorial High School, and has described herself as being "a rowdy kid" there. She is known for her infectious, howling laugh which can be heard in the film The Laughing Policeman and on her appearances on The Tonight Show Starring Johnny Carson.

Cassidy majored in art at Syracuse University. During her time there, she married Kennard C. Kobrin in 1963, a doctor in residency, and found work as a fashion model. They moved to San Francisco, where her husband set up a psychiatric practice, while Cassidy continued modeling. They had a son and a daughter together. In 1968, she landed a bit part in the thriller film Bullitt.

In June 2025, she reportedly is in a relationship with her former co-star Suzanne Somers' widower, Alan Hamel.

== Career ==
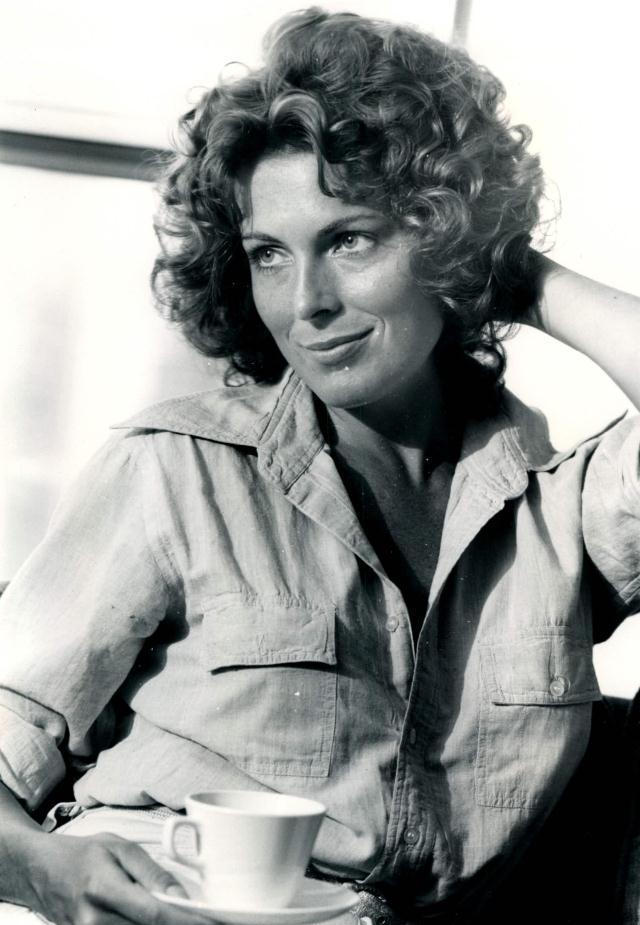
Joanna Cassidy in 1974

Cassidy's first major film appearance was in the 1973 thriller The Outfit. She appeared in a 1973 Smokey Bear public service announcement, and on such television series as Mission: Impossible, Starsky & Hutch and Taxi. She had a secondary role in the drama film Stay Hungry (1976), a film about bodybuilding that featured a young Arnold Schwarzenegger. Cassidy was considered for the role of Wonder Woman for a television series, but lost it to Lynda Carter. She co-starred in the film Our Winning Season (1978). Her first regular role was as sheriff's pilot Morgan Wainwright in the action-adventure series 240-Robert (1979), although the series lasted for only two abbreviated seasons. Afterwards, Cassidy continued to appear in guest roles in series such as Dallas and Falcon Crest, as well as a regular role on the short-lived sitcom Buffalo Bill (1983) (for which she earned a Golden Globe Award). She starred as a lead character, CIA operative Liz "Foxfire" Towne, in the short-lived NBC action television series Code Name: Foxfire (1985).

In 1982, Cassidy had her breakthrough film role as the replicant snake performer Zhora Salome in Ridley Scott's science-fiction film Blade Runner. The following year, she co-starred in Under Fire with Gene Hackman and Nick Nolte, earning her a Sant Jordi Award and a nomination for a National Society of Film Critics Award. She continued to appear in both films and television; she co-starred in the television miniseries Hollywood Wives (1985), and appeared in The Fourth Protocol (1987), Who Framed Roger Rabbit (1988), 1969 (1988), The Package (1989), Where the Heart Is (1990) and Don't Tell Mom the Babysitter's Dead (1991). In 1993, she co-starred with Dudley Moore on the sitcom Dudley, but the series only lasted for six episodes. She played the ex-wife of James Garner's lead character in the television movie, The Rockford Files: I Still Love L.A. (1994).

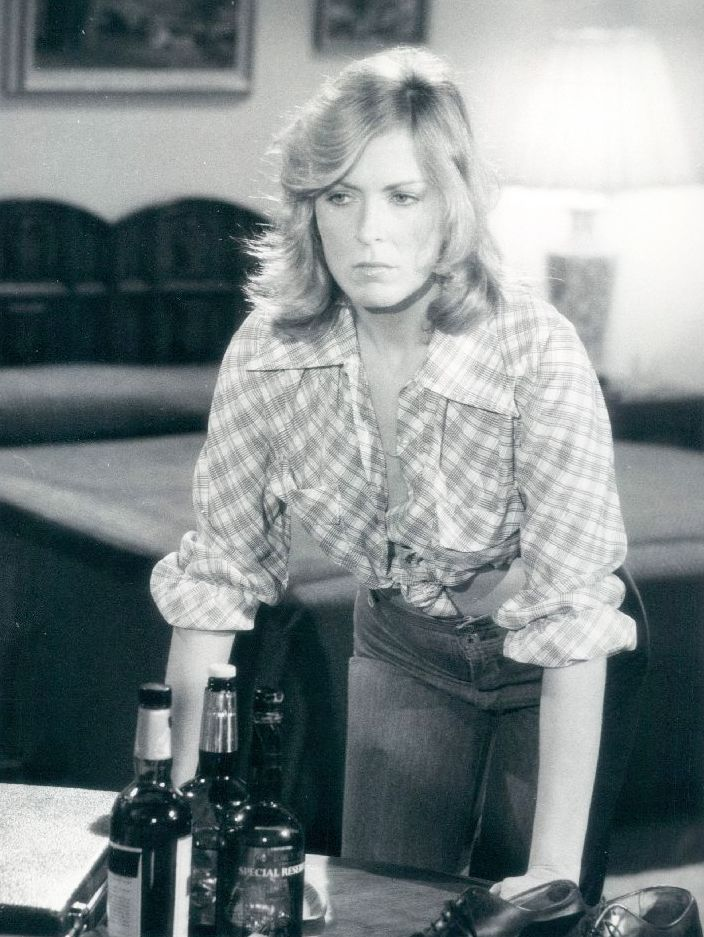
Joanna Cassidy in 1976

Her other screen credits from this era include Barbarians at the Gate (1993), the miniseries adaptation of Stephen King's The Tommyknockers (1993), and Wes Craven's Vampire in Brooklyn (1995). Cassidy also provided the voice of Inspector Maggie Sawyer on The WB series Superman: The Animated Series, and had recurring guest roles on television series such as L.A. Law, Melrose Place, Diagnosis: Murder, and The District.

Since 2000, Cassidy has appeared in the film Ghosts of Mars (2001), directed by John Carpenter, and had a recurring role as Margaret Chenowith on the HBO drama series Six Feet Under, for which she received Emmy Award and Screen Actors Guild Award nominations. In 2004, she guest-starred in three episodes of Star Trek: Enterprise as T'Les (the Vulcan mother of Enterprise crewmember T'Pol), and she had a recurring role as Beverly Bridge on the series Boston Legal in 2006. She voiced the villainess Hecubah in the computer game Nox (2000) and once again voiced Maggie Sawyer in the 2002 video game Superman: Shadow of Apokolips.

In the spring of 2007, Cassidy donned Zhora's costume once more, 25 years after the release of Blade Runner, to recreate a climactic scene from the film for the autumn 2007 Final Cut release of the film. In the original 1982 release, a stunt performer played out Zhora's death scene, with the physical differences between the performer and Cassidy very evident (including the stuntwoman wearing a different wig). For the Final Cut, Cassidy's head was digitally transposed onto footage of the stunt performer, making the death scene fit continuity. According to the DVD featurette, All Our Variant Futures, Cassidy herself suggested this be done; she is captured on video making the suggestion during filming of a retrospective interview related to Blade Runner.

In the second season of the NBC series Heroes, she is seen in a photo of the 12 senior members of the show's mysterious company. Beyond appearances in photographs, the actress first appeared as Victoria Pratt in the 10th episode of season two, "Truth & Consequences", during which her character was killed.

In 2008–2009, Cassidy appeared in episodes of Ghost Whisperer, Desperate Housewives, and Law & Order: UK, and was also seen in the recurring guest role of Amanda Hawthorne, the mother-in-law of Jada Pinkett Smith's eponymous character on the medical drama Hawthorne.

In 2011, Cassidy began to appear in a recurring role on the ABC series Body of Proof as Judge Joan Hunt, the mother of Megan Hunt, Dana Delany's character on the series. The series was canceled by ABC after three seasons in May 2013. In 2015, Cassidy was cast as a main character in the Bravo scripted series Odd Mom Out. She plays the role of Candace Von Weber, a snobbish Upper East Side socialite and mother-in-law to the show's protagonist Jill Weber (Jill Kargman). The series was canceled in 2017. In 2019, she co-starred in the Amazon Prime miniseries Too Old to Die Young and later had a recurring role on NCIS: New Orleans.

In 2015, Cassidy received an honorary award at the Oldenburg International Film Festival.

== Filmography ==
=== Film ===
| Year | Title | Role | Notes |
|---|---|---|---|
| 1968 | Bullitt | Party Guest | Uncredited |
| 1970 | Fools | Minor role | Uncredited |
| 1973 | The Outfit | Rita Mailer | |
| 1973 | The Laughing Policeman | Monica | |
| 1974 | Bank Shot | Eleonora | |
| 1975 | The Cursed Medallion | Joanna Morgan | |
| 1976 | Stay Hungry | Zoe Miller | |
| 1977 | Prime Time a.k.a. American Raspberry | Lisa Allen | |
| 1977 | The Late Show | Laura Birdwell | |
| 1977 | Stunts | Patti Johnson | |
| 1978 | Our Winning Season | Sheila | |
| 1979 | The Glove | Sheila Michaels | |
| 1980 | Night Games | Julie Miller | |
| 1982 | Blade Runner | Zhora Salome | |
| 1983 | Under Fire | Claire | Sant Jordi Award for Best Foreign Actress; Nominated - National Society of Film Critics Award for Best Actress |
| 1984 | Invitation to Hell | Patricia "Pat" Winslow | |
| 1986 | Club Paradise | Terry Hamlin | |
| 1987 | The Fourth Protocol | Irina Vassilievna | |
| 1988 | Who Framed Roger Rabbit | Dolores | Nominated - Saturn Award for Best Supporting Actress |
| 1988 | 1969 | Ev Karr | |
| 1989 | The Package | Eileen Gallagher | |
| 1990 | Where the Heart Is | Jean McBain | |
| 1991 | Don't Tell Mom the Babysitter's Dead | Rose Lindsey | |
| 1991 | Lonely Hearts | Erin Randall | |
| 1991 | All-American Murder | Erica Darby | Video |
| 1992 | Landslide | Lucy Matterson | |
| 1995 | Vampire in Brooklyn | Captain Dewey | |
| 1996 | Chain Reaction | Maggie McDermott | |
| 1997 | Loved | Elenore Amerson | |
| 1997 | Executive Power | Elaine Fields - First Lady | |
| 1998 | Dangerous Beauty | Laura Venier | |
| 2000 | Moonglow | Ginny | |
| 2000 | The Right Temptation | Maryanne | |
| 2001 | Ghosts of Mars | Whitlock | |
| 2001 | Anthrax | Jackie Potter | |
| 2004 | Intermission | Love | Short film |
| 2005 | Witches of the Caribbean | Professor Avebury | Video |
| 2006 | The Virgin of Juarez | Eve | |
| 2006 | Larry the Cable Guy: Health Inspector | Lily Micelli | |
| 2006 | The Grudge 2 | Mrs. Davis | |
| 2007 | Kiss the Bride | Evelyn Golski | |
| 2008 | The American Standards | Ann Jennings | |
| 2008 | The Human Contract | Rose | |
| 2009 | Stolen | Lea Adkins | |
| 2009 | For Sale by Owner | Linda Flannery | |
| 2010 | Flying Lessons | Totty Kuspert | |
| 2010 | Anderson's Cross | Mrs. McCarthy | |
| 2011 | Carjacked | Betty | |
| 2012 | What Might Have Been: Snake Dance | Zhora Salome | Short film |
| 2013 | Zugzwang | Nancy Williams | |
| 2013 | Heaven's Door | Ruth Christensen | |
| 2014 | Night Vet | Kelly | Short film |
| 2015 | Too Late | Eleanor Mahler | |
| 2015 | Visions | Helena | |
| 2020 | My True Fairytale | Sylvia Goodwin | |
| 2021 | Simone (AKA Art of Love) | Rose the book store owner | |
| 2024 | Don't Tell Mom the Babysitter's Dead | Fashion Show Buyer | |
| 2025 | Uppercut | Rita Stooth | |
| 2025 | Killing Faith | Maggie | |
| TBA | Yesteryear | | |

=== Television ===
| Year | Title | Role | Notes |
|---|---|---|---|
| 1972–1973 | Mission: Impossible | Model, Stewardess | 3 episodes |
| 1976 | McCoy | Unnamed role | Episode: "New Dollar Day" |
| 1978 | The Roller Girls | Selma "Books" Cassidy | 4 episodes |
| 1978 | Taxi | Beverly | Episode: "High School Reunion" |
| 1978 | Starsky & Hutch | Harry / Monique | Episode: "The Avenger" |
| 1979–1982 | The Love Boat | Joan Horner, Lisa Lessing | 2 episodes |
| 1979 | Kaz | Unnamed role | Episode: "A Piece of Cake" |
| 1979–1980 | 240-Robert | Deputy Morgan Wainwright | 13 episodes |
| 1980 | Reunion | Peggy Sager | Television film |
| 1980 | Hagen | Eve | Episode: "The Rat Pack" |
| 1980 | Insight | Lucy | Episode: "Resurrection" |
| 1980 | Dallas | Sally Bullock | 2 episodes |
| 1980–1981 | Trapper John, M.D. | Dr. Carson Whitaker, Maggie Holtz | 2 episodes |
| 1981 | Charlie's Angels | Stacy | Episode: "Hula Angels" |
| 1981 | Enos | Unnamed role | Episode: "The Head Hunter" |
| 1981 | Hart to Hart | Belle | Episode: "Slow Boat to Murder" |
| 1981 | Flo | Billy June | Episode: "Footsie" |
| 1982 | Strike Force | Eve Murphy | Episode: "Turnabout" |
| 1982 | Lou Grant | Barbara Costigan | Episode: "Charlie" |
| 1982 | Falcon Crest | Katherine Demery | 5 episodes |
| 1983 | The Family Tree | Elizabeth Nichols | Episode: "1.2" |
| 1983 | Fantasy Island | Christine Donovan | Episode: "Nurses Night Out" |
| 1983–1984 | Buffalo Bill | Jo Jo White | 26 episodes Golden Globe Award for Best Actress - Television Series Musical or Comedy; Nominated - Primetime Emmy Award for Outstanding Lead Actress in a Comedy Series |
| 1985 | Code Name: Foxfire | Elizabeth "Foxfire" Towne | 8 episodes |
| 1985 | Hollywood Wives | Marilee Gray | 2 episodes |
| 1986 | Pleasures | Lillian Benton | Television film |
| 1986 | The Children of Times Square | Sue Roberts | Television film |
| 1988 | Nightmare at Bittercreek | Allison Shapiro | Television film |
| 1990 | A Girl of the Limberlost | Gene Stratton-Porter | Television film |
| 1990 | Bar Girls | Claudia Reese | Television film |
| 1990 | Wheels of Terror | Laura | Television film |
| 1990 | Les belles Américaines | Lorraine | Television film |
| 1992 | Northern Exposure | Solvang Planey | Episode: "The Three Amigos" |
| 1992 | The Ray Bradbury Theater | Lavinia | Episode: "The Lonely One" |
| 1992 | Live! From Death Row | Alana Powers | Television film |
| 1992 | Taking Back My Life: The Nancy Ziegenmeyer Story | Geneva Overholser | Television film |
| 1993 | Barbarians at the Gate | Linda Robinson | Television film |
| 1993 | The Tommyknockers | Sheriff Ruth Merrill | Miniseries |
| 1993 | Dudley | Laraine Bristol | 5 episodes |
| 1993 | CBS Schoolbreak Special | Linda Jurgenson | Episode: "Other Mothers"; Nominated - Daytime Emmy Award for Outstanding Performer in a Children's Special |
| 1993–1994 | L.A. Law | Judge Carolyn Walker | 4 episodes |
| 1994 | Burke's Law | Liz Charles | Episode: "Who Killed the Beauty Queen?" |
| 1994 | Murder, She Wrote | Willie Greenwood | Episode: "Roadkill" |
| 1994 | Hotel Malibu | Eleanor "Ellie" Mayfield | 6 episodes |
| 1995 | Eye of the Stalker | Judge Martha Knowlton | Television film |
| 1997 | Melrose Place | Kate Reilly | 3 episodes |
| 1997 | The Second Civil War | Helena Newman | Television film |
| 1997–1998 | Superman: The Animated Series | Maggie Sawyer | Voice, 8 episodes |
| 1998 | Rude Awakening | Colleen Woods | Episode: "TV Mom" |
| 1998 | The Hunger | Grace Wallace | Episode: "The Other Woman" |
| 1998 | Circle of Deceit | Elaine Greer | Television film |
| 1999 | Tribe | Gina Brava | Miniseries |
| 1999 | Twice in a Lifetime | Christine Esposito | Episode: "Quality of Mercy" |
| 1999–2000 | Diagnosis: Murder | Madison Wesley | 8 episodes |
| 2000 | Rude Awakening | Colleen Woods | Episode: "Star 80 Proof" |
| 2001 | Philly | Marian Marshall | Episode: "Pilot" |
| 2001–2002 | The District | Teddy Reed | 5 episodes |
| 2001–2005 | Six Feet Under | Margaret Chenowith | 21 episodes Nominated - Primetime Emmy Award for Outstanding Guest Actress in a Drama Series; Nominated - Screen Actors Guild Award for Outstanding Performance by an Ensemble in a Drama Series |
| 2003 | Less than Perfect | Norma | Episode: "Claude's Got a Secret" |
| 2003 | Hidden Hills | Carol | Episode: "The Visit" |
| 2003 | Everwood | Evelyn Rowser | Episode: "The Price of Fame" |
| 2004 | Star Trek: Enterprise | T'Les | 3 episodes |
| 2005 | The Reading Room | Diana Weston | Television film |
| 2006 | Boston Legal | Beverly Bridge | 5 episodes |
| 2007 | Heroes | Victoria Pratt | Episode: "Truth & Consequences" |
| 2008 | In Plain Sight | Deandra Bevins | Episode: "Never the Bride" |
| 2008 | Ghost Whisperer | Faith Clancy | Episode: "Threshold" |
| 2008 | Criminal Minds | Mrs. Holden | Episode: "52 Pickup" |
| 2009 | Desperate Housewives | Melina Cominis | Episode: "Home Is the Place" |
| 2009 | Hawthorne | Amanda Hawthorne | 4 episodes |
| 2010 | Notes from the Underbelly | Kay | Episode: "The Circle of Life" |
| 2010–2012 | Call Me Fitz | Elaine Fitzpatrick | 18 episodes Canadian Screen Award for Best Actress in a Comedy Series (2015); Canadian Screen Award for Best Performance by an Actress in a Featured Supporting Role or Guest Role in a Comedic Series (2013); Nominated - Gemini Award for Best Performance by an Actress in a Featured Supporting Role or Guest Role in a Comedic Series (2011) |
| 2011–2013 | Body of Proof | Joan Hunt | 14 episodes |
| 2012 | Franklin & Bash | Captain Gina Vaughn | Episode: "Summer Girls" |
| 2013 | Bones | Marianne Booth | 2 episodes |
| 2013 | Living the Dream | Claire | Television film |
| 2015–2017 | Odd Mom Out | Candace Von Weber | Recurring season 1, Main seasons 2 & 3 |
| 2015 | Married | Sharon | Episode: "The Cruise" |
| 2016 | The Odd Couple | Judy | Episode: "Make Room for Dani" |
| 2016 | Lady Dynamite | Barbara | Episode: "Jack and Diane" |
| 2016 | Motive | Natalie Rodman | 2 episodes |
| 2017 | Confess | Beverly | 4 episodes |
| 2018 | Life in Pieces | Charlotte Collins | Episode: "Parents Ancestry Coupon Chaperone" |
| 2019 | The Cool Kids | Joanie | Episode: "The Cool Kids Plus One" |
| 2019 | Tacoma FD | Trudy Towers | Episode: "Old Flame" |
| 2019 | Too Old to Die Young | Eloise | Miniseries |
| 2019–2021 | NCIS: New Orleans | Mena Pride | Recurring role |
| 2021 | Younger | Judith Clarke | Episode: "The Son Also Rises" |
| 2021 | Leverage: Redemption | Stella | Episode: "The Jackal Job" |
| 2022 | The L Word: Generation Q | Patty | 3 episodes |
| 2025 | Matlock | Lucille Morris | 1 episode |
