= Watts family murders =

2018 familicide in Colorado

- The Watts Family nine months before the murders. Chris poses with his wife Shanann and their children Bella (standing) and Celeste.
- Location: Frederick, Colorado, U.S.
- Date: August 13, 2018; 8 years ago
- Attack type: Familicide, mass murder, uxoricide, filicide, child murder, feticide
- Victims: 4 (Note: Shanann Watts; Bella Marie Watts; Celeste Cathryn "CeCe" Watts; Nico Watts (unborn))
- Perpetrator: Christopher Lee Watts
- Motive: Resentment against his wife and children, infidelity
- Verdict: Pleaded guilty
- Convictions: First-degree murder (5 counts) (Note: Three counts of premeditated murder and two counts of murder of a child 12 years or younger under a position of trust.); Unlawful termination of a pregnancy; Tampering with a deceased human body (3 counts)
- Sentence: Three consecutive life sentences without the possibility of parole, plus 84 years

In the early hours of August 13, 2018, in Frederick, Colorado, Christopher Watts murdered his pregnant wife, Shanann, by strangulation, and their daughters, Bella and Celeste, by suffocation. He buried Shanann in a shallow grave near an oil‑storage site and placed the girls' bodies inside crude‑oil tanks, each with an opening only 8 inches wide.

Watts initially denied involvement in the family's disappearance, but on August 15 he was arrested after admitting during an interview with detectives that he had been responsible for Shanann's death. He later acknowledged that he had also murdered his daughters. On November 6, 2018, Watts pleaded guilty to multiple counts of first‑degree murder under a plea agreement in which the death penalty—later abolished in Colorado in 2020—was removed from consideration. He was sentenced to five life terms without the possibility of parole, three of them to be served consecutively.

== Background ==
Christopher Lee Watts (born May 16, 1985) and Shanann Cathryn Rzucek (January 10, 1984 – August 13, 2018) were from North Carolina: Watts from Spring Lake and Rzucek from Aberdeen. The two met in 2010 via Facebook and married in Mecklenburg County on November 3, 2012. They had two daughters: Bella "Bells" Marie Watts (December 17, 2013 – August 13, 2018) and Celeste Cathryn "Cece" Watts (July 17, 2015 – August 13, 2018). At the time of her death, Shanann was 15 weeks pregnant with a boy, who was to be named Nico.

The family lived in a five- bedroom home at 2825 Saratoga Trail in Frederick, Colorado, which they purchased in 2013. They filed for bankruptcy in 2015. Watts worked for Anadarko Petroleum, while Shanann worked from home selling a product called "Thrive" for the multi-level marketing company Le-Vel. In mid 2018, Watts began an extra-marital affair with a female co-worker.

== Disappearance ==
At approximately 1:48 a.m. on Monday, August 13, 2018, Shanann returned from a business trip to Arizona and was driven home by her friend and colleague Nickole Utoft Atkinson. Over the weekend, Watts had been at home with their daughters. Later that day, Atkinson reported Shanann and the girls missing after Shanann failed to attend a scheduled obstetrics and gynecology appointment and did not respond to text messages. When Shanann also missed a business meeting, Atkinson went to the Watts residence at about 12:10 p.m. After repeated knocks and doorbell rings went unanswered, she contacted Watts, who was at work, and notified the Frederick Police Department.

A Frederick police officer arrived at approximately 1:40 p.m to conduct a welfare check. Watts would not allow the officer permission to search the home until he arrived, where the family dog was found unharmed but no trace of Shanann or the children was discovered. Searchers located Shanann's purse, which contained her keys and medication. Her phone was later found between the couch cushions in the living room. Her car, with the girls' car seats still inside, remained parked in the garage. Shanann's wedding ring was discovered on the bedside table during the search.

The FBI and the Colorado Bureau of Investigation (CBI) joined the investigation the following day. Watts initially told police that he did not know where his family might be and that he had last seen his wife at 5:15 a.m. the previous day, when he left for work. He gave interviews to Denver stations KMGH-TV and KUSA-TV outside the family home, pleading for the return of his wife and daughters. During one of the interviews, investigators with search dogs could be heard working on the property.

== Legal proceedings ==
=== Arrest and charges ===
Watts family murders
1 Watts family home at 2825 Saratoga Trail, Frederick
2 Oil storage site where the bodies of Shanann, Bella and Celeste were discovered

On August 15, 2018, the FBI joined the search for Shanann and her daughters. Watts was administered a polygraph examination, which he failed. He then confessed—first to his father, Ronnie, and subsequently to investigators—that he had killed Shanann, though he falsely claimed that he did so only after witnessing her smother their daughters. Watts alleged that he discovered Bella's body and that, upon finding Shanann strangling Celeste, he strangled Shanann in a rage before transporting all three bodies to an Anadarko Petroleum oil site where he was employed. He was arrested that day.

Watts marked the locations of the bodies on a photograph of the oil field for investigators, who arrived at the site at 11:00 p.m. The bodies of Bella and Celeste, who had been smothered by Watts with his bare hands, were recovered from separate crude‑oil storage tanks, while Shanann was found buried in a shallow grave nearby. Each child's body had been pushed through a hatch at the top of a different tank, with the opening measuring 8 inches (20 centimetres) in diameter. According to the medical examiner, "Bella had scratches on her left buttock from being shoved through this hole. A tuft of blonde hair was found on the edge of one of these hatches."

On August 21, prosecutors charged Watts with three counts of first-degree murder, including an additional count for each child under a provision covering the death of a child under 12 by a person in a position of trust. He was also charged with unlawful termination of a pregnancy and three counts of tampering with a deceased human body. Anadarko terminated his employment on the day of his arrest. Watts was denied bail at his initial court appearance.

On November 29, Colorado authorities released surveillance footage recorded in the early morning hours of August 13 by a neighbor's security camera. The video showed Watts loading a gas can into the bed of his pickup truck and then backing the vehicle into his garage. Investigators concluded that he was transporting his daughters and his wife's body to the remote oil site where they were later found. The footage, captured shortly after Shanann returned home from her business trip, demonstrated that she did not leave the house with the children that morning, contradicting Watts's initial statements to police.

The case has been widely associated in media coverage with the phenomenon of family annihilation (familicide). Many such crimes occur in August, before the start of the school year, which can delay detection and investigation. Former FBI profiler Candice DeLong noted that cases of this type are uncommon because "family annihilators usually commit suicide after the murders", an action Watts later claimed he had contemplated out of guilt. In an interview on Dr. Phil, Watts's attorney stated that Watts confessed to killing Shanann following an argument about divorce. During the attack, Bella entered the room, and Watts told her that Shanann was ill. He then loaded Shanann's body and the two girls—without their car seats—into the back seat of his work truck, later smothering the children one after the other.

=== Plea deal and sentencing ===
Watts pleaded guilty to the murders on November 6. The District Attorney of Weld County did not pursue the death penalty at the request of Shanann's family, who stated that they did not wish for any further deaths and supported Watts's decision to accept the plea agreement. On November 19, he was sentenced to five life terms—three to be served consecutively and two concurrently—without the possibility of parole. He received an additional 48 years for the unlawful termination of Shanann's pregnancy and 36 years for three counts of tampering with a deceased human body.

On December 3, 2018, Watts was transferred to an out‑of‑state facility due to "security concerns". Two days later, on December 5, he arrived at Dodge Correctional Institution, a maximum-security prison in Waupun, Wisconsin, where he continues to serve his life sentences.

== Media accounts ==
On a December 2018 episode of the ABC News series 20/20, Shanann's parents were interviewed for the first time since the murders. That same month, HLN aired a special report titled Family Massacre: Chris Watts Exposed, which included previously unreleased footage from police body cameras and security cameras inside the police station's interview rooms. In a recorded interview released by the CBI, Watts's girlfriend described changes in his behavior in the days leading up to the murders.

Also in December 2018, the American talk show Dr. Phil, aired an episode in which host Phil McGraw spoke with four analysts—former prosecutor and journalist Nancy Grace, former FBI profiler Candice DeLong, law enforcement consultant Steve Kardian, and body-language expert Susan Constantine—who examined Watts's motivations, conduct, and psychological profile. In January 2019, The Dr. Oz Show featured commentary on the case during an in‑studio interview with the neighbor who had assisted investigators.

In June 2021, Inside Edition reported additional confessions that Watts had made to a pen pal. In multiple letters, he stated that he had planned the murders for several weeks and claimed that the oxycontin found in Shanann's system had been administered by him in an attempt to end her pregnancy, believing that doing so would make it easier for him to remain with his girlfriend. Watts also wrote that he had attempted to smother his daughters in their beds at home but was initially unsuccessful.

== Adaptations ==
On December 7, 2019, Oxygen released a one‑hour documentary about the case as the first episode of the third season of its television program Criminal Confessions. On January 26, 2020, Lifetime premiered Chris Watts: Confessions of a Killer as part of its "Ripped from the Headlines" feature-film series. The film stars Sean Kleier as Watts and Ashley Williams as Shanann. Shanann's family publicly objected to the production, stating that they had not been consulted, were unaware of the film until it was already in development, and were not receiving any compensation from it. They also expressed concern that the film would exacerbate the online harassment they had already been experiencing.

On September 30, 2020, Netflix released American Murder: The Family Next Door, a documentary about the killings. The film incorporates extensive archival material, including home videos, social media posts, text messages, and law‑enforcement recordings.

== See also ==
- Crime in Colorado

=== Similar cases ===
- Williams family murders
- John List
- Bradford Bishop
- Robert William Fisher
- Dupont de Ligonnès murders and disappearance
- Alex Murdaugh
