= The Winter Show =

The Winter Show is an annual art, antiques, and design fair organized by East Side House Settlement and held at the Park Avenue Armory in New York City. All net proceeds from the fair benefit East Side House Settlement, which provides education, technology training, and college opportunities to residents of the Bronx and Northern Manhattan.

The Winter Show is a ten-day event held each year at the Park Avenue Armory. In 2024, The Show celebrated its Platinum Jubilee (70th Anniversary) to become America's longest running art, antiques, and design fair. Each year, over seventy exhibitors from North America and Europe are featured. The New York Times describes the show as a “galaxy of colliding worlds,” with works ranging from Egyptian antiquities to postwar Italian art glass.

All works are vetted by a committee of 150 experts for authenticity, date, and condition.

Formerly known as The Winter Antiques Show, in 2018 the fair's name was changed to The Winter Show "to recognize and embrace the long-standing breadth and diversity of its exhibitors." The 2019 Winter Show was the first to be known by the updated name.

== History ==
The fair was first established in 1954 when two young antiques dealers, John Bihler and Henry Coger, suggested the creation of an antique show-fundraiser for East Side House Settlement to the charity's co-director Grace Lindquist. Their proposal came days after socialite Norris Harkness enlisted Lindquist's help to sell five Louis Vuitton trunks at the National Antiques Show, during which time Bihler and Coger witnessed Lindquist's acumen for antiques. On Monday, January 24, 1955, the fair opened at the Seventh Regiment Armory with one hundred dealers from the East Coast. By the end of the decade, The Winter Show was seen as the leading event of its kind in the United States.

In 1970, the Show's first catalogue was produced, and the fair hosted a loan show of 19th-century American paintings and objects from the Metropolitan Museum of Art, reflecting a focus on American art at the fair.

The fair's annual loan exhibitions promote the collections of American museums and have included loan shows from The Metropolitan Museum of Art, New-York Historical Society, and Peabody Essex Museum.

In 1993, the vetting process that is still in use today was introduced.

In 1995, Arie L. Kopelman was named co-chair of The Winter Show.

In 2015, Lucinda C. Ballard and Michael R. Lynch joined Kopelman as co-chairs of The Winter Show.

In 2017, Arie L. Kopelman was named Chairman Emeritus of The Winter Show. Lucinda C. Ballard and Michael R. Lynch continue to serve as the Show's Co-Chairs.

In 2018, Helen Allen was appointed The Winter Show's Executive Director. Michael Diaz-Griffith is the Show's Associate Executive Director.

In 2025, The Winter Show will return to the Park Avenue Armory to celebrate its 71st year.

== Loan exhibitions ==
- 2004: The Metropolitan Museum of Art
- 2005: New-York Historical Society
- 2006: George Washington's Mount Vernon
- 2007: Museum of Early Southern Decorative Arts (MESDA)
- 2008: The Shaker Museum and Library
- 2009: The Corning Museum of Glass
- 2010: Colonial to Modern: A Century of Collecting at Historic New England
- 2011: Grandeur Preserved: Masterworks Presented by Historic Charleston Foundation
- 2012: Celebrating Historic Hudson Valley at 60: Rockefeller Patronage in Sleepy Hollow Country
- 2013: Newport: The Glamour of Ornament (The Preservation Society of Newport County)
- 2014: Fresh Take, Making Connections at the Peabody Essex Museum
- 2015: Ahead of the Curve: The Newark Museum 1909-2015
- 2016: Legacy for the Future: Wadsworth Atheneum Museum of Art
- 2017: Abby Aldrich Rockefeller Folk Art Museum: Revolution & Evolution
- 2018: Collecting for the Commonwealth/Preserving for the Nation: Celebrating a Century of Art Patronage 1919-2018 (Virginia Museum of Fine Arts)
- 2019: Collecting Nantucket, Connecting the World (Nantucket Historical Association)
- 2020: Masterworks from the Hispanic Society Museum and Library

== Bibliography ==
- "Abby Aldrich Rockefeller Folk Art Museum Selected as the Featured Loan Exhibition at the 2017 Winter Antiques Show to Launch the Museum's Sixtieth Anniversary Year." Sept. 19, 2016. ArtfixFaily. http://www.artfixdaily.com/artwire/release/9589-abby-aldrich-rockefeller-folk-art-museum-selected-as-the-featured
- Ballard, Lucinda C. "The Iconic Phoenix." Winter Antiques Show 2014 Exhibition Catalogue (2014): 1–276.
- Beach, Laura. "Hudson River Classics." The Magazine Antiques. Jan. - Feb. 2012. https://classicalamericanhomes.org/wp-content/uploads/2012-Jan-Feb-Hudson-River-Classics-The-Magazine-Antiques.pdf
- Behre, Robert. "Charleston Paintings, Ceramics, Furniture, Other Items Head for Winter Antiques Show in New York City." The Post and Courier. Jan. 13, 2011. https://www.postandcourier.com/news/charleston-paintings-ceramics-furniture-other-items-headed-for-winter-antiques/article_0179def3-cf2f-51a3-b883-42541aa47128.html
- Diaz-Griffith, Michael. "An Outpost of Friendship, Learning, and Hope: The Making of East Side House Settlement." Winter Antiques Show 2016 Exhibition Catalogue (2016): 1–228.
- Dietz, Ulysses Grant. "Newark Museum: 106 Years Ahead of the Curve." Antiques and Fine Art. 2015. https://www.newarkmuseum.org/sites/default/files/antique-and-fine-arts.pdf
- "East Side House Settlement." Winter Antiques Show 2014 Exhibition Catalogue (2014): 1–276.
- Genocchio, Benjamin. "A Winter Wonderland of Old and Modern Invites Meandering." The New York Times. Jan. 22, 2009. https://www.nytimes.com/2009/01/23/arts/design/23wint.html
- "Historic New England's Centennial To Be Celebrated at 2010 Winter Antiques Show." ArtFixDaily. Nov. 13, 2009. http://www.artfixdaily.com/artwire/release/historic-new-england%E2%80%99s-centennial-to-be-celebrated-at-2010-winter-antiques-show
- Hartigan, Lynda. "A World of Connections at The Peabody Essex Museum." InCollect. Jan. 14, 2014. https://www.incollect.com/articles/a-world-of-connections-at-the-peabody-essex-museum
- Hunt, Stephanie. "A Grand Tour." Charleston Magazine. Jan. 2011. https://charlestonmag.com/features/a_grand_tour
- Mason, Brook S. "New Lamps for Old." Artnet Magazine. Jan. 2009. http://www.artnet.com/magazineus/reviews/mason/mason1-28-09.asp
- Metzgar, Johanna Brown. "The Museum of Early Southern Decorative Arts: A Southern Backcountry Perspective at the Winter Antiques Show." InCollect Dec. 18, 2007. https://www.incollect.com/articles/the-museum-of-early-southern-decorative-arts
- Moonan, Wendy. "The Bustling Season of American Art and English Pottery." The New York Times. Jan. 13, 2006. https://www.nytimes.com/2006/01/13/arts/design/the-bustling-season-of-american-art-and-english-pottery.html
- "New Views at the 55th Annual Winter Antiques Show." The Magazine Antiques. Feb. 2, 2009. http://www.themagazineantiques.com/article/winter-antiques-show-2009/
- "New England Antiques - In the News." Fine Books Magazine. Jan. 13, 2010. https://www.finebooksmagazine.com/press/2010/01/new-englad-antiques.phtml
- Oseid, John. "Virginia Museum of Fine Arts to Headline Manhattan's Winter Antiques Show." Forbes. Jan. 17, 2018. https://www.forbes.com/sites/johnoseid/2018/01/17/virginia-museum-of-fine-arts-to-headline-manhattans-winter-antiques-show/#38764f597cce
- Robinson, Katherine S. "Charleston's Master Works Presented by Historic Charleston Foundation." Antiques & Fine Art. 2011. http://www.antiquesandfineart.com/articles/media/images/00901-01000/00981/Robinson_Charleston.indd.pdf
- Rosenberg, Karen. "Recalling an Opulent Age Through Its Trove of Art." The New York Times. Jan. 24, 2013. www.nytimes.com/2013/01/25/.../winter-antiques-show-at-park-avenue-armory.html
- Schwendener, Martha. "The Winter Antiques Show Embraces the Evolving Definition of Antique." The New York Times. Jan. 18, 2018. https://www.nytimes.com/2018/01/18/arts/winter-antiques-show-review.html
- Smith, Roberta. "Winter Antiques Show Offers a Collection of Rare and Recent Works." The New York Times. Jan. 22, 2016. https://www.nytimes.com/2016/01/22/arts/design/winter-antiques-show-offers-a-collection-of-recent-and-rare-works.html
- "The Shaker Museum to Display 100 Shaker Objects at Winter Antiques Show." Art Daily. http://artdaily.com/index.asp?int_sec=11&int_new=22824&int_modo=2#.W6EgoRNKi9Y
- "Washington Crosses the Hudson for Americana Week." Antiques and Arts Weekly. Jan. 25, 2006. https://www.antiquesandthearts.com/washington-crosses-the-hudson-for-americana-week/
- "Winter Antiques Show Celebrates its 55th Year with Five New Exhibitions and a Loan Exhibition from the Corning Museum of Glass." Antiques Publicity. Jan. 19, 2009. http://antiquespublicity.com/2009/01/19/winter-antiques-show-celebrates-its-55th-year-with-five-new-exhibitors-and-a-loan-exhibition-from-the-corning-museum-of-glass/
- "Winter Antiques Show Celebrates the 2014 Loan Exhibition from Peabody Essex Museum with Lecture Series." Jan. 16, 2014. ArtFixDaily. http://www.artfixdaily.com/artwire/release/7527-winter-antiques-show-celebrates-the-2014-loan-exhibition-from-pea
- "Winter Antiques Show Celebrates its 56th Year with Six New Exhibitors and a Loan from Historic New England." Antiques Publicity. Nov. 17, 2009. http://antiquespublicity.com/2009/11/17/winter-antiques-show-celebrates-its-56th-year-with-six-new-exhibitors-and-a-loan-exhibition-from-historic-new-england/
- "Winter Antiques Show Runs to Feb 1 At Park Avenue Armory." Antiques and Arts Weekly. Jan. 27, 2009. https://www.antiquesandthearts.com/winter-antiques-show-runs-to-feb-1-at-park-avenue-armory/
- "58th Winter Antiques Show Celebrates the Rockefeller Family Patronage of Historic Hudson Valley." ArtDaily. 2011. http://artdaily.com/news/51911/58th-Winter-Antiques-Show-celebrates-the-Rockefeller-family-patronage-of-historic-Hudson-Valley
- "61st Annual Winter Antiques Show: 106 Years Ahead of the Curve at the Newark Museum." Artsy. 2015. https://www.artsy.net/show/newark-museum-61st-annual-winter-antiques-show-106-years-ahead-of-the-curve-at-the-newark-museum
