= Wedding Season =

- Official release poster
- Directed by: Tom Dey
- Written by: Shiwani Srivastava
- Produced by: Swati Shetty; Tony Hernandez; John Hodges
- Starring: Suraj Sharma; Pallavi Sharda; Rizwan Manji; Veena Sood; Ari Afsar; Sean Kleier; Manoj Sood
- Cinematography: Meena Singh
- Edited by: David L. Bertman
- Music by: Jongnic Bontemps; Raashi Kulkarni
- Production companies: Jax Media; Samosa Stories; Imagine Entertainment
- Distributed by: Netflix
- Release date: August 4, 2022
- Running time: 98 minutes
- Country: United States
- Language: English

Wedding Season is a 2022 American romantic comedy film directed by Tom Dey and written by Shiwani Srivastava. The film stars Suraj Sharma, Pallavi Sharda, Rizwan Manji, Veena Sood, Ari Afsar, Sean Kleier, and Manoj Sood.

Wedding Season was released on August 4, 2022.

== Plot ==
Asha is an economist who has recently broken off her engagement and left a Wall Street banking career behind to work for a microfinance startup in New Jersey. Her mother Suneeta, concerned for her future and against the advice of her husband Vijay, sets up a dating profile for her. She relents when Asha agrees to meet Ravi, an MIT grad with a start-up whose profile was also set up by his parents. On their date, she explains that she's focused on her career over relationships.

When they meet again at a wedding, Asha convinces Ravi to fake a relationship to avoid critique from family friends at all the weddings they've been invited to. She tells him about her initiative to lend money to disadvantaged South Asian women, and learns that Ravi moonlights as DJ Spellbound with his friend Yoshi. Over the course of the summer, their mutual attraction grows, but they decide to keep their real feelings secret.

Asha centers her pitch on her family's immigration story, impressing the investors and her bosses, who offer her a promotion to their headquarters in London.

Suneeta assumes Asha and Ravi are engaged and invites Ravi's parents over for a surprise lunch. Asha is angered by her parents' involvement in her personal life, but her sister Priya points out her and Ravi's relationship was fake. In turn, Ravi admits he's a college dropout and has been secretly keeping his family's restaurant afloat with money from stocks. Asha realizes he'd also donated to her project and contributed to her promotion. She ends their relationship, feeling betrayed by his dishonesty. Ravi argues with his parents about their disappointment in who he has turned out to be, and asks them to accept him.

Asha's boss James encourages her to accept the promotion, just as he had left Jamaica for England years ago. Her dad visits her office and encourages her to go as well.

Priya gets cold feet the morning of her wedding to Nick . Asha reminds her of her love for him, and realizes her own love for Ravi. Priya and Nick marry and introduce DJ Spellbound at the reception. Ravi's parents defend his choices and affirm that they are proud of him. Ravi and Asha get back together. During the credits, the cast perform a Bollywood-style dance.

== Cast ==
- Suraj Sharma as Ravi
- Pallavi Sharda as Asha
- Rizwan Manji as Vijay, Asha's father
- Arianna Afsar as Priya
- Sean Kleier as Nick
- Veena Sood as Suneeta, Asha's mother
- Manoj Sood as Dinesh, Ravi's father
- Sonia Dhillon Tully as Veena
- Ruth Goodwin as Tina
- Damian Thompson as James
- Subhash Santosh as Darshit
- Julius Cho as Yoshi

== Production ==
In 2018, Shiwani Srivastava's script, Wedding Season, placed in multiple screenwriting competitions, including the Academy Nicholl Fellowship, Final Draft's Big Break, and the ScreenCraft Comedy Competition. After winning the ScreenCraft Comedy Competition, the ScreenCraft team introduced her to an executive at Netflix, as well as her literary manager at Affirmative Entertainment. As a direct result of those introductions, Wedding Season was sold to Netflix.

In March 2021, was announced that Suraj Sharma and Pallavi Sharda would star in an upcoming romantic comedy film titled Wedding Season, written by Shiwani Srivastava and directed by Tom Dey for Netflix. Later the same month Rizwan Manji and Ari Afsar joined to the cast. On April 15, 2021 Sean Kleier also was set to star.

Principal photography began on April 19 and concluded on May 31, 2021, in Toronto, Canada. The film included outdoor and restaurant scenes shot in the Gerrard India Bazaar area of Toronto and the Lahore Tikka House restaurant.

== Reception ==
On the review aggregator website Rotten Tomatoes, 88% of 17 critics' reviews are positive, with an average rating of 7.2/10.
