= Where the Heart Is (1990 film) =

1990 film by John Boorman

- Theatrical poster
- Directed by: John Boorman
- Written by: John Boorman; Telsche Boorman
- Produced by: John Boorman; Edgar F. Gross
- Starring: Dabney Coleman; Uma Thurman; Joanna Cassidy; Crispin Glover; Suzy Amis; Christopher Plummer
- Cinematography: Peter Suschitzky
- Edited by: Ian Crafford
- Music by: Peter Martin
- Production company: Touchstone Pictures
- Distributed by: Buena Vista Pictures Distribution
- Release date: February 23, 1990
- Running time: 107 minutes
- Country: United States
- Language: English
- Budget: $15 million
- Box office: $1,106,475

Where the Heart Is is a 1990 American romantic comedy film co-written and directed by John Boorman and starring Dabney Coleman, Uma Thurman, Joanna Cassidy, Crispin Glover, Suzy Amis, and Christopher Plummer.

== Plot ==
Stewart McBain is a successful self-made demolitions expert who blows up buildings for a living. In the midst of one such project, a group of protesters stops the last building on a lot, the Dutch House, from being demolished. When McBain appears on TV to dismiss the protests, he is made to look foolish. Returning home, his three college-aged children – Daphne, Chloe, and Jimmy – ridicule him for his television appearance.

Feeling his children are spoiled, McBain kicks them out of the house. Giving them each $750, he drops them off at the Dutch House, which is dilapidated and on the verge of collapse. Jean, their mother, tries to stop him but in vain.

In order to finance their new lives, the children take on housemates. These include a fashion designer named Lionel; a homeless magician, Shitty; a stockbroker, Tom; and Sheryl, an amateur occultist. Chloe is commissioned to finish a calendar for an insurance company. Lionel has to complete his designs for a fashion show. Chloe uses her roommates to model in the calendar, incorporating their bodies into ethereal trompe l'oeil murals on their walls, and Lionel ends up using some of them for his show.

A stock market crash where Tom is chiefly responsible for McBain's stock plummeting brings McBain to ruin. He desperately attempts to stave off a hostile takeover of his demolition company, but fails. Jean shows up at the Dutch House hysterical as he loses their home and they become destitute.

McBain disappears into the city, feeling down and out, sleeping in the homeless cardboard box shanty town, scavenging the next day in the dump. Ultimately, his children take him in after Sheryl finds him, and he starts to see the world in a new light.

When the family are evicted from Dutch House after they have all helped Lionel with his dresses and Chloe with her calendar, the homeless shelter turns the McBains and friends away. Jimmy has an epiphany, as there is a bad thunderstorm and the Dutch House is structurally unsound, to use his father's demolition skills.

The family recovers their properties and wealth, and have learned how to live more simply.

== Cast ==
- Dabney Coleman as Stewart McBain
- Joanna Cassidy as Jean McBain
- Suzy Amis as Chloe McBain
- Uma Thurman as Daphne McBain
- David Hewlett as Jimmy McBain
- Crispin Glover as Lionel
- Christopher Plummer as "Shitty"
- Maury Chaykin as Harry
- Dylan Walsh as Tom
- Sheila Kelley as Sheryl
- Ken Pogue as Hamilton

== Reception ==
Where the Heart Is was poorly received by critics. On review aggregator Rotten Tomatoes, the film holds a score of 9% based on 11 reviews, with an average rating of 3.8/10. Roger Ebert of the Chicago Sun-Times wrote, "[The film] is essentially a fable set in the wrong city. Its story doesn't fit in New York or seem correctly placed in 1990; it's not quick-witted or street-smart enough."
