= Uppercut (film) =

- Theatrical release poster
- Directed by: Torsten Ruether
- Written by: Torsten Ruether
- Produced by: Torsten Ruether; Luise Grossman; Matthew Berkowitz; Josef Brandmaier; Stephen Castor
- Starring: Ving Rhames; Luiii; Jordan E. Cooper; Joanna Cassidy
- Cinematography: Gevorg Gev Juguryan; Mattia Palombi
- Edited by: Savannah Bayse
- Music by: Brass Against
- Production companies: Hello Moment Productions; Good Weird Films; How Ru? Entertainment; Huffman Creative; Its Just Us Productions; Penned Pictures
- Distributed by: Lionsgate Films; Grindstone Entertainment Group
- Release dates: January 23, 2025 (Germany); February 28, 2025 (United States)
- Running time: 104 minutes
- Countries: United States; Germany
- Language: English

Uppercut is a 2025 thriller drama film written and directed by Torsten Ruether and starring Ving Rhames, Luiii, Jordan E. Cooper and Joanna Cassidy. It is an English language remake of Ruether’s 2021 German film Leberhaken.

== Cast ==
- Luise Grossmann aka Luiii as Toni Williams
- Ving Rhames as Elliott Duffond
- Jordan E. Cooper as Payne Harris
- Joanna Cassidy as Rita Stooth

== Production ==
Filming occurred during the 2023 SAG-AFTRA strike; production on the film was allowed to continue during the strike due to an interim agreement with SAG-AFTRA.

In May 2024, it was announced that Grindstone Entertainment Group acquired North American distribution rights to the film.

== Release ==
The film was released in theaters on February 28, 2025. The film was also released on demand and digital platforms the same day.

== Reception ==
The film has a 6% rating on Rotten Tomatoes based on 17 reviews. Sheila O’Malley of RogerEbert.com awarded the film one and a half stars out of four. Jeff Ewing of Collider rated the film a 4 out of 10.
