= Sean Kleier =

American actor (born 1987)

- Born: Sean Thompson Kleier; 1987 (age 38–39); Louisville, Kentucky, US
- Occupation: Actor
- Years active: 2011–present

Sean Thompson Kleier (born 1987) is an American actor. He is primarily known for the role of Lex Von Weber in the situation comedy Odd Mom Out, Mikel in the satire series Happyish and appeared as Agent Stoltz in the 2018 superhero film Ant-Man and the Wasp.

== Biography ==
Kleier grew up in Louisville, Kentucky, and was educated there at Kentucky Country Day School. He further studied at Bowdoin College before moving to New York and doing improv with the Upright Citizens Brigade.

A co-founder of the production and media strategy company Motiv Creative, Kleier and his brother Ryan create content for political advocacy groups, particularly Represent.Us, a non-profit working on grass roots corruption, campaign finance reform and electoral reform.

Kleier played Agent Stoltz in the film Ant-Man and the Wasp (2018). He played convicted murderer Chris Watts in the Headline News docudrama Family Massacre: Chris Watts Exposed (2020).

== Filmography ==
Film roles
Year	Title	Role	Notes
2014	Julia	Tim	
2014	She Lights Up Well	Zach	
2014	Homeward.	Julian	
2015	Hamlet, Son of a Kingpin	Laertes	
2015	Sam	Doc	
2015	The Intern	Bartender	
2016	The Hudson Tribes	Officer Russo	
2017	After Party	Hollis	
2017	Life Hack	Peter	
2017	Off Season	Devon	
2017	Sam	Doc	
2018	Ant-Man and the Wasp	Agent Stoltz	
2020	Chris Watts: Confessions of a Killer	Chris Watts	
2022	Wedding Season	Nick	

Television roles
Year	Title	Role	Notes
2013–2014	Hey Girl	Bailey	2 episodes
2014	What Would You Do?	Waiter	Season 9, Episode 2
2014	Madam Secretary	Tyler Cole	Episode: "Pilot"
2014	The Affair	Will	2 episodes
2014–2015	Mr. Right	Bryce	Main role
2015	Happyish	Mikal	7 episodes
2015–2017	Odd Mom Out	Lex Von Weber	Main role
2016	Younger	Lucas	Episode: "P Is for Pancake"
2016	Conviction	Josh Fleck	Episode: "Bad Deals"
2018	Blue Bloods	Bobby Jones	Episode: "Legacy"
2019	Chicago Fire	Keith	Episode: "What I Saw"
2020	9-1-1	Greg	4 episodes
2023	Accused	TBA	Episode: "Brenda's Story"
