= Odd Mom Out =

American situational comedy

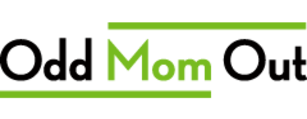
- Genre: Sitcom
- Created by: Jill Kargman
- Based on: Momzillas by Jill Kargman
- Starring: Jill Kargman; Andy Buckley; KK Glick; Sean Kleier; Abby Elliott; Joanna Cassidy
- Country of origin: United States
- Original language: English
- No. of seasons: 3
- No. of episodes: 30 (list of episodes)

Production
- Executive producers: Ken Druckerman; Banks Tarver; Jill Kargman; Tim Piper; Daniel M. Rosenberg; Tony Hernandez; Julie Rottenberg (seasons 1-2); Elisa Zuritsky (seasons 1-2)
- Production location: New York City, New York
- Camera setup: Single-camera
- Running time: 22 minutes
- Production companies: Rottenberg-Zuritsky Productions (seasons 1-2); Piro Vision; Jax Media; Left/Right Productions

Original release
- Network: Bravo
- Release: June 8, 2015 – September 13, 2017

Odd Mom Out is an American sitcom that was created by and starring Jill Kargman. A 10-episode first season was ordered by the American cable television network Bravo. The series focuses on Jill Kargman playing a fictionalized version of herself, Jill Weber, who is forced to navigate the clique of wealthy mothers who reside in New York's prestigious Upper East Side. The principal photography commenced in September 2014; the show is filmed at various locations in New York City. The series premiered on June 8, 2015. On September 22, 2016, the network renewed Odd Mom Out for a 10-episode third season shortly after the second season concluded. On October 6, 2017, the show was canceled after its third season.

== Concept ==
Odd Mom Out is based on the novel Momzillas which was published in 2007 by Jill Kargman. The book was developed into a television series, in which Kargman plays Jill Weber, a fictionalized version of herself who "is living in an ecosystem that has become so elite, so hip, and so trendy, that she now finds herself the 'odd mom out'." The half-hour comedy is not-so-loosely based on Jill's own life; the series chronicles the life of ultra-wealthy "momzillas" living in New York's Upper East Side. Other cast members include Andy Buckley who plays Jill's wealthy and noble husband, Andy, Abby Elliott as Brooke, Jill's sister-in-law and a fellow "momzilla", Sean Kleier as Jill's extremely successful brother-in-law, Lex, KK Glick as Vanessa, an ER doctor and Jill's best friend, and Joanna Cassidy who plays Jill's mother-in-law, Candace.

Jill Kargman created the satirical series inspired by her real-life experiences living in New York City. The female characters are depicted as typical snooty moms of Upper East Side living a privileged life, trying to survive in highly competitive environment, and "surrounded by lacquered socialites". "Laughter is the key for me. This is not trying to do a study on a neighborhood or send up a particular petri dish of a world," series' creator explains the main goal of the show. "It's really just to make people laugh. That's my only hope."

== Development ==
Bravo announced the development of Odd Mom Out in April 2014. The series is a part of the new direction that Bravo, an American cable television network which has predominantly aired shows in the reality genre, has been trying to take by adding scripted programming to their lineup. Frances Berwick, the president of Bravo since 2010, explained the decision by saying that the network is "going into this because we feel like it will complement the schedule and, to a certain extent, round out what we are already doing on the unscripted side." Berwick also acknowledged that finding success in developing scripted television would "probably add a cachet of quality". Odd Mom Out is the network's second scripted series as part of its scripted television block with the first being Girlfriends' Guide to Divorce which debuted on Bravo in December 2014, and was subsequently renewed for a second season After the second season concluded, the series was renewed for a third season. The network had a brief fling with scripted television back in 2004 with Significant Others, a sitcom heavy on improvization that aired 12 episodes over two seasons.

The idea of creating a television series originated in 2013, about two years prior to its premiere. Numerous books written by Jill Kargman were optioned to be developed into film or television projects, however, none of them were implemented. The television series was greenlit after Kargman was introduced to Lara Spotts, Head of Development at Bravo, by Andy Cohen, who is closely associated with the network. "When incredibly talented author and New York socialite Jill Kargman stomped her way into our offices we knew we had found Bravo's very own Lena Dunham or Louis C.K.," said Lara Spotts later to explain the reason of hiring Kargman. "Jill's unique ability to satirize the very exclusive, ridiculously competitive and highly entertaining world of Manhattan's momzillas makes Odd Mom Out the perfect series to expand Bravo's slate of scripted programming," she also stated.

== Cast ==
- Jill Kargman as Jill Weber, a fictionalized version of herself, a stay-at-home mother to three children and wife to her husband Andy.
- Andy Buckley as Andy Weber, Jill's rich and blue-blood husband.
- K. K. Glick as Vanessa Wrigley, an ER doctor and Jill's best friend who always tries to keep her in check and keep her sane.
- Sean Kleier as Lex Von-Weber, Jill's successful brother-in-law.
- Abby Elliott as Brooke Von-Weber, Jill's sister-in-law, although they both have a tense relationship because they are tied by their family. She is "the quintessential momzilla"; her husband is a multimillionaire, with whom Brooke raises three children and expecting another one. "She comes from a place of insecurity, so that's why she is the way she is," Elliott describes her character.
- Joanna Cassidy as Candace Von-Weber (seasons 2–3, recurring season 1), Jill's mother-in-law who is overly obsessed with Weber family matriarch status.

== Episodes ==
Season	Episodes	Originally released	
Season	Episodes	First released	Last released
1	10	June 8, 2015	August 3, 2015
2	10	June 20, 2016	August 29, 2016
3	10	July 12, 2017	September 13, 2017

== Reception ==
What makes it all so lively is that no jokes are worked to death by a talented cast. ... The scene where Jill is singled out for torture and ridicule at a philanthropic spinning class, yet rises above both in triumph, almost without saying a word, is one of many little gems in this pleasing little show.

— Nancy DeWolf Smith from The Wall Street Journal

Odd Mom Out was met with generally positive reviews from television critics. At Metacritic, which assigns a weighted mean rating out of 100 to reviews from mainstream critics, the comedy received an average score of 68, based on 10 reviews. The review aggregator website Rotten Tomatoes lists an 81% approval rating, based on 16 reviews, with a rating average of 6.4/10. The site's consensus states: "Odd Mom Out should offer laughs to its niche target demographic, but will prove most enjoyable in small doses." Keith Uhlich of The Hollywood Reporter described the show as "amusing, quick-witted basic cable sitcom." Particularly praising the writing and an accurate portrayal of "the spoiled denizens of Manhattan's Upper East Side", he added that Jill Kargman's sense of humor is "so specific and expertly realized, not to mention superbly complemented by each supporting cast member, that it's often easy to overlook how fish-in-a-barrel the show's objects of ridicule are." David Wiegand, writing for San Francisco Chronicle, was more pessimistic toward the show by saying that "there's a danger that Odd Mom Out has too narrow a focus, even for fans of Real Housewives shows." However, he appreciated show's humor and cleverness. "In small doses, it's funny enough," he also added. Tom Conroy from Media Life Magazine describes Odd Mom Out as "full of moments that are oddly off" and adds that "a show that's all about acceptance and rejection should have tried harder to make a better first impression".

Nancy DeWolf Smith from The Wall Street Journal gave the show a positive review describing it as "a sweet, frothy surprise" by saying that the "comedy, like the acting talent and timing of its star, Jill Kargman, is a sweet summer treat". Diane Werts, writing for Newsday, gave the series a lukewarm review, saying that the pilot episode of Odd Mom Out "feels oddly both overbroad and too nuanced, only finding some right-sized funny near its end," also adding that "you wouldn't want to live there, but it might be worth a weekly visit." Brian Lowry of Variety was more critical about the show and by saying it is "as slim as its size-zero dresses," also adding that "there's precious little sense of irony evident in a program that satirizes ostentatious displays of fabulousness on a channel that wallows in them elsewhere, as if Bravo is trying to have its cake and mock it". He also said the show is "a less successful effort" compared to another scripted series, Girlfriends' Guide to Divorce, which airs on the same network, because "while Jill's predicament would certainly make for a fine New Yorker essay, it's not so terrific in sustaining a TV series."
