= Jill Kargman =

American author, writer and actress

Jill Allison Kargman
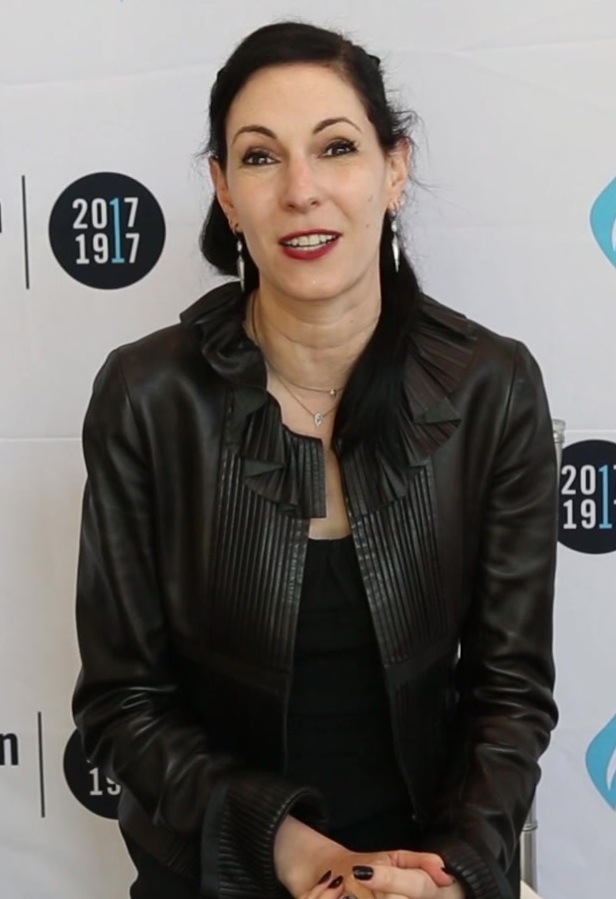
- Born: 1974 or 1975 (age 51–52); New York City, U.S.
- Occupations: Actress; Author
- Spouse: Harry Kargman (m. 2002)
- Children: Sadie Kargman; Ivy Kargman; Fletcher Kargman
- Parent(s): Arie L. Kopelman; Coco Kopelman
- Relatives: Will Kopelman (brother)
- Website: jillkargman.com

Jill Kargman is an American author, writer, and actress. A common theme in her works is critical examination of the lives of wealthy women in her city. Her 2007 novel Momzillas was adapted into the Bravo television show Odd Mom Out (2015–2017).

== Selected works ==
Kargman appears as a satirical version of herself in a Bravo-scripted comedy television show called Odd Mom Out. The show is written by her and based on her novel Momzillas. The show is based on Kargman's life and portrays the outrageous lifestyles of extremely wealthy mothers who live on the Upper East Side. Time Magazine named Odd Mom Out one of "2015's Top 10 TV Shows" stating, "It's the smartest piece of anthropology on cable - and something to make TV fans grateful that something so specific and deeply thought-through can exist in the shallow end of cable's pool." In the book Kargman describes "momzillas" as mothers who are "negligent, domineering, competitive, preachy, and sad". Kirkus Reviews described Momzillas as "a decent effort that debunks the myth of the perfect mommy".

The Ex-Mrs. Hedgefund was published in April 2009. Kirkus Reviews described the book as "funny, but in the current economic context ill-timed" due to its 2009 publication during the Great Recession. A reviewer for the Chicago Tribune called the book "a hot summer read".

Pirates and Princesses was published in September 2011. Kargman wrote the book with her 8-year-old daughter Sadie; illustrations were provided by Christine Davenier. The book's target audience is children aged 4–8. A reviewer for Kirkus said "Teachers especially will turn to this good-natured story".

Sometimes I Feel Like a Nut: Essays and Observations from an Odd Mom Out was published in Kindle format by HarperCollins e-books in February 2011. One reviewer said that the book's observations could "deflate the overinflated egos among the Manhattan elite", and that it also gave insight into Kargman's life.

The Rock Star in Seat 3A was published in 2012. A reviewer for USA Today summarized it as being "funny and irreverent, a brash and appealing account of a long-devoted fan-girl and how she copes with her rock idol fantasy come true".

In 2026, Kargman co-wrote and starred in Influenced directed by Rachel Israel, focusing on an influencer chasing followers.

== Personal life ==
Kargman is the daughter of Arie L. Kopelman, former president of Chanel, and Coco Kopelman. Her younger brother, Will Kopelman, is an art consultant. Kargman attended Yale University, Spence School, and the Taft School. Kargman's spouse, Harry Kargman, owns a company called Kargo, which provides mobile advertising. They have three children, Sadie, Ivy, and Fletch.

Kargman dislikes being called a socialite, as she feels it negates the work she does. Her makeup and skin-care rituals have been widely reported on.

Kargman, who is Jewish, compared the 2025 New York City Democratic mayoral primary to a "spiritual Kristallnacht" and said the result "proved Jew hatred is now OK."

== Works ==
- The Right Address, with Carrie Karasyov. Broadway Books, April 2004.
- Wolves In Chic Clothing: A Novel, with Carrie Karasyov. Broadway Books, April 2005.
- Momzillas. Broadway Books, April 2007.
- Jet Set, with Carrie Karasyov. HarperCollins, January 2009.
- Summer Intern, with Carrie Karasyov. HarperTeen, January 2009.
- The Ex-Mrs. Hedgefund. Plume, February 2009.
- Bittersweet Sixteen, with Carrie Karasyov. HarperTeen, October 2009.
- Arm Candy: A Novel. Plume, May 2010.
- Sometimes I Feel Like A Nut: Essays and Observations From An Odd Mom Out. HarperCollins e-books, February 2011.
- Pirates and Princesses, with Sadie Kargman. Dutton Books for Young Readers, September 2011.
- The Rock Star in Seat 3A. William Morrow, May 2012.
- Sprinkle Glitter on My Grave. September 2016.
