= Zoo City =

2010 novel by Lauren Beukes

- Cover of the 2010 British edition of Zoo City
- Author: Lauren Beukes
- Language: English
- Published: 1 June 2010 (South Africa); 2 September 2010 (UK); 28 December 2010 (US/Canada)
- Publisher: Jacana Media (South Africa); Angry Robot (UK/US/Canada)
- ISBN: 978-1-77009-818-3
- OCLC: 643496230

Zoo City is a 2010 science fiction novel by South African author Lauren Beukes. It won the 2011 Arthur C. Clarke Award and the 2010 Kitschies Red Tentacle for best novel. The cover of the British edition of the book was awarded the 2010 BSFA Award for best artwork, and the book itself was shortlisted in the best novel category of the award.

== Plot ==
Zoo City is set in an alternate version of the South African city of Johannesburg, in which people who have committed a crime are magically attached to an animal familiar – those who receive such punishment are said to be "animalled". The novel's chief protagonist, Zinzi December, is a former journalist and recovering drug addict who was "animalled" to a sloth after getting her brother killed. She lives in the Johannesburg suburb of Hillbrow, which is nicknamed "Zoo City" in the novel for its large population of animalled people, refugees and the dispossessed. Zinzi is attempting to repay the financial debt she owes her drug dealer by charging people for her special skill of finding lost objects, as well as making use of her writing abilities by drafting 419 fraud emails. The book's plot focuses on Zinzi's attempts to find the missing female member of a brother-and-sister pop duo for a music producer, in return for the money she needs to fully repay her dealer.

=== Animalling ===
Being animalled is described in the novel as an automatic consequence – not just in South Africa, but for all humans worldwide – of bearing a significant amount of guilt. The distinction between moral and legal culpability is unclear, as is the threshold which triggers animalling; however, being responsible for the death of another human is a definite trigger.

Every animal gives its "owner" a different psychic power; however, the owner must stay close to the animal at all times, or be subject to debilitating panic attacks, nausea, and other withdrawal symptoms. The animals are not limited by the normal lifespans of their species, but can die by violence; should the animal die, the owner will be torn to shreds by a mysterious dark cloud called the Undertow within minutes.

== Development history ==
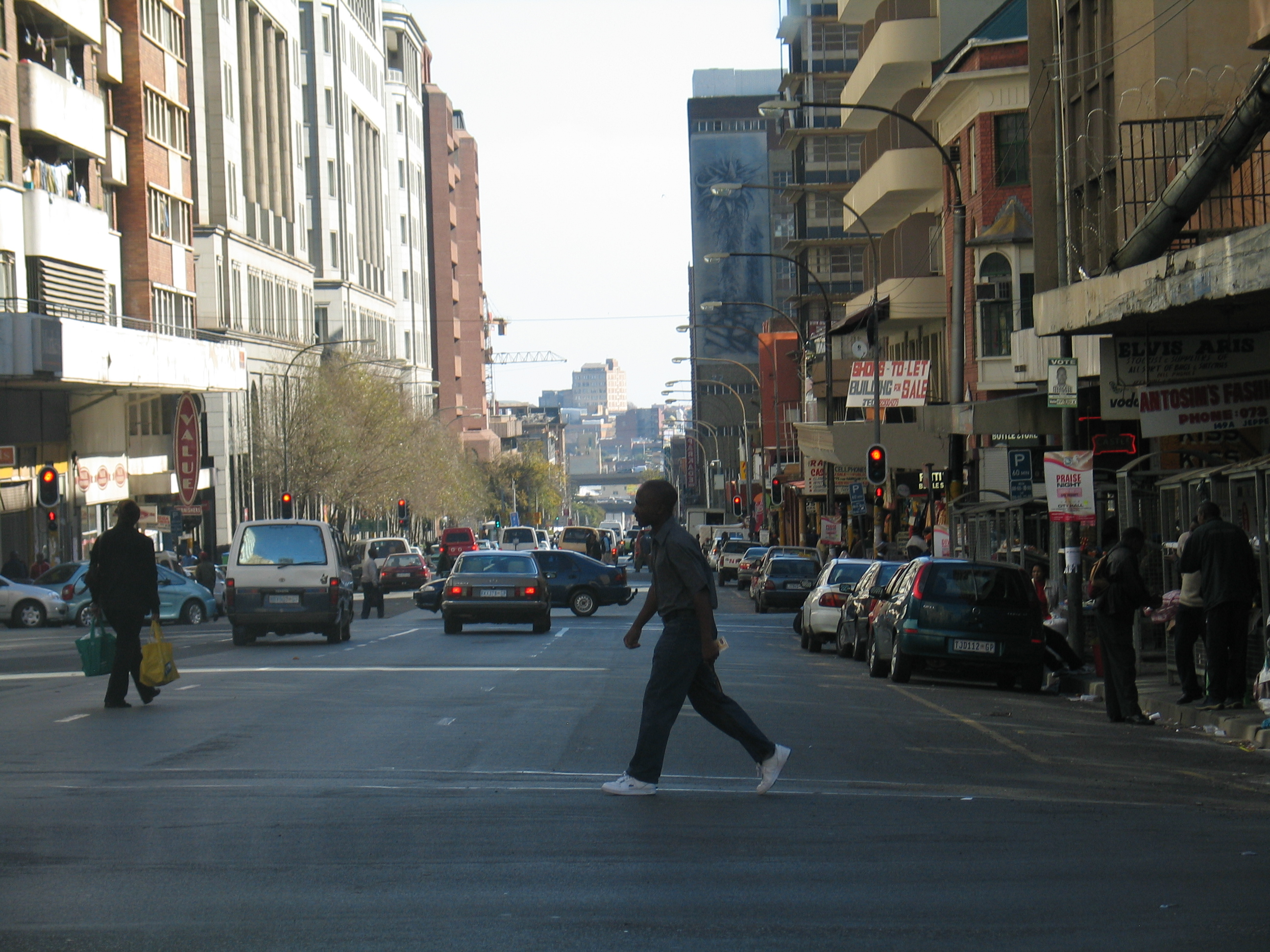
A street in Hillbrow in 2006.

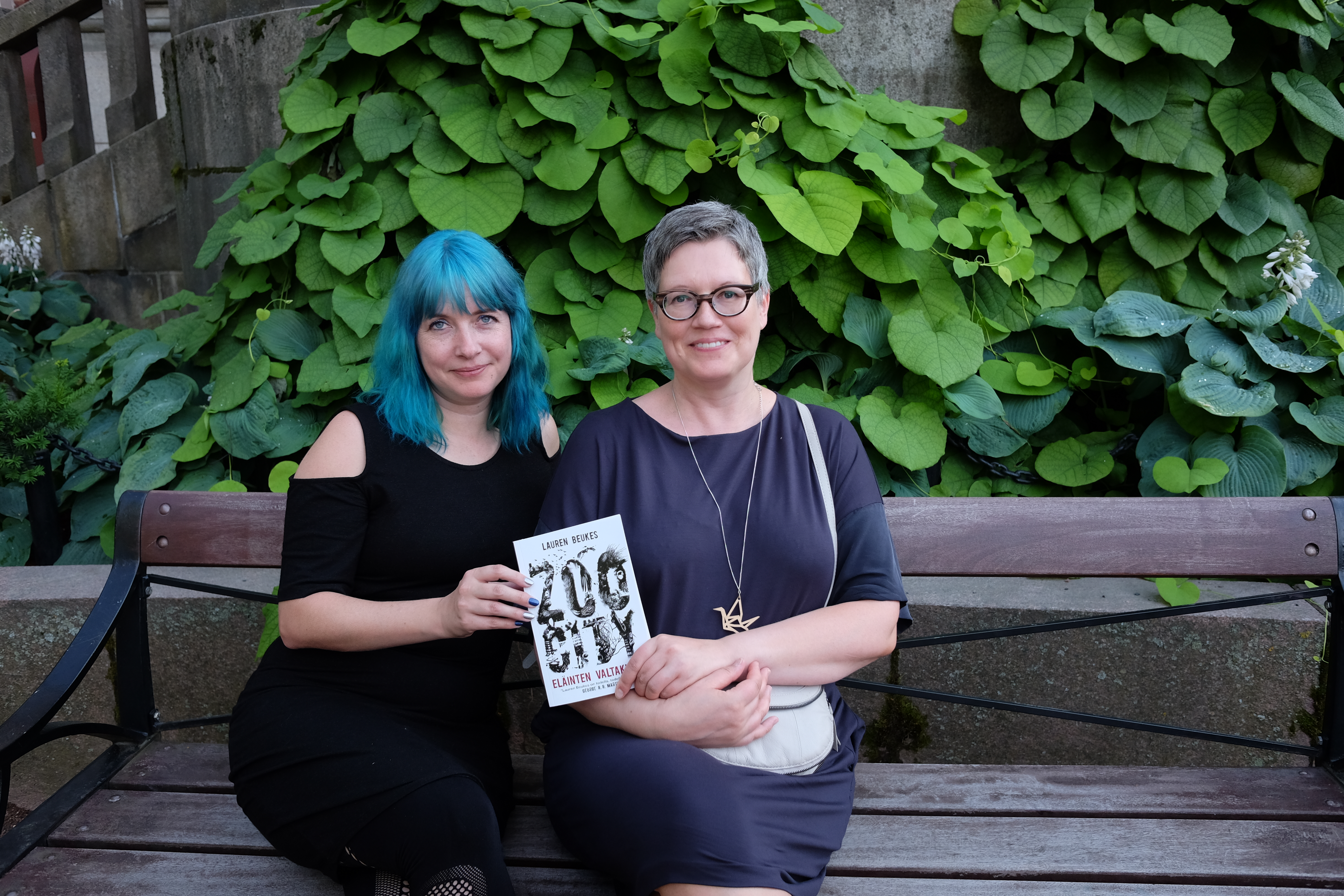
Lauren Beukes and the Finnish translator of Zoo City, Tytti Viinikainen, in Turku in 2018.

Beukes began writing Zoo City after signing a two-book deal with the British publisher Angry Robot for her first novel, Moxyland, and a subsequent book. While she spent four years working on Moxyland, Zoo City took just over a year to complete. To research Zoo City, Beukes – who was born in Johannesburg but currently lives in Cape Town – hired a fixer to help her meet contacts in Hillbrow, the inner city suburb of Johannesburg in which much of the book is set, and spent days walking around the area. Her consultants included Zukiswa Wanner (who Beukes described as her "official culture editor") and Verashni Pillay.

=== Publication history ===
- 2010: South Africa, Jacana Media. ISBN 978-1-77009-818-3. Publication date: 1 June 2010. Paperback.
- 2010: United Kingdom, Angry Robot. ISBN 978-0-85766-054-1. Pub. date: 2 September 2010. Paperback.
- 2010: eBook, Angry Robot. ISBN 978-0-85766-056-5. Pub. date: September 2010. eBook.
- 2010: United States and Canada, Angry Robot. ISBN 978-0-85766-055-8. Pub. date: 28 December 2010. Mass market paperback.

== Awards and nominations ==
Zoo City was awarded the 2011 Arthur C. Clarke Award on 28 April 2011. This award is given to the best science fiction novel first published in the United Kingdom during the previous year, and is considered the most prestigious British science fiction award. Beukes wore a fake sloth draped over her shoulders to the award ceremony in London, mimicking Zinzi December's animal familiar.
The cover of the 2010 British edition of the book, which was designed by Joey Hi-Fi, won the 2010 BSFA Award on 26 April 2011 for best artwork. The book itself was shortlisted in the best novel category of this award, but lost out to Ian McDonald's book The Dervish House, which at the time was considered the favourite for the Arthur C. Clarke Award.
The book had previously received the 2010 Kitschies Red Tentacle award for best novel, as the book that "best elevates the tone of geek culture".

In South Africa, the novel was shortlisted for several prizes, including the 2010-2011 University of Johannesburg Creative Writing Prize, the 2011 M-Net Literary Awards and the Nielsen's Booksellers' Choice Award 2011. It was also long-listed for the 2011 Sunday Times Fiction Prize. and nominated for the 2011 World Fantasy Award for best novel.

== Planned film adaptation ==
In November 2011, South African film producer Helena Spring won the film rights to Zoo City. Beukes was slated to write the film's script, while Spring planned to offer the project to a shortlist of directors. Beukes's literary agent said that "Helena outbid all the others in a spirited auction for film rights to this extraordinary book: she had an extremely proactive, writer-friendly approach to working with Lauren and offered an imaginative and creative proposal that was irresistible."

In November 2013, Donovan Marsh was announced as the prospective film's director. At this time Marsh was developing a script with input from Beukes, and the film was scheduled to go into production in the second half of 2014.

== Influence ==
The book had a strong influence on the lipstick art of Sarah Britten, who stated on her art website:

Zoo City is riotous, chaotic and completely crazy and I loved the way it brought to life the animal energy that lurks just beneath the surface of the city. After reading the book, I started experimenting with placing animals in cityscapes, both the kind that are found in cities (dogs and cats) and those that exist in Johannesburg only as metaphors – sharks and crocodiles, for example. I’ve used a limited palette of black, grey and red to evoke the dystopian atmosphere of the city, its grey grittiness a contrast to throbbing red life.
