= Shining Girls =

2022 American science fiction thriller television series

- Genre: Drama; Thriller
- Created by: Silka Luisa
- Based on: The Shining Girls by Lauren Beukes
- Starring: Elisabeth Moss; Wagner Moura; Phillipa Soo; Chris Chalk; Amy Brenneman; Jamie Bell
- Composer: Claudia Sarne
- Country of origin: United States
- Original language: English
- No. of seasons: 1
- No. of episodes: 8

Production
- Executive producers: Elisabeth Moss; Silka Luisa; Leonardo DiCaprio; Lindsey McManus; Jennifer Davisson; Lauren Beukes; Alan Page Arriaga; Michelle MacLaren; Rebecca Hobbs; Daina Reid
- Running time: 41–59 minutes
- Production companies: Love & Squalor Pictures; Michelle MacLaren Entertainment; Appian Way Productions; MRC Television

Original release
- Network: Apple TV+
- Release: April 29 – June 3, 2022

Shining Girls is an American science fiction thriller television series based on the 2013 novel The Shining Girls by Lauren Beukes. The series stars Elisabeth Moss, Wagner Moura and Jamie Bell. It premiered on Apple TV+ on April 29, 2022. A portion of the series premiered at South by Southwest on March 11, 2022.

== Premise ==
Kirby Mazrachi is an archivist at the Chicago Sun-Times. Years ago, she was brutally attacked and left for dead, but her assailant was never found. Today she is still traumatized by the assault and struggles to make sense of her reality that keeps changing. Determined to find her attacker, she discovers a murder that has a striking resemblance to her own attack. Kirby enlists the help of reporter Dan Velazquez; together they uncover several decades-old cold cases of similar murders and hunt for a mysterious serial killer.

== Cast ==
=== Main ===
- Elisabeth Moss as Kirby Mazrachi / Sharon Leads, Chicago Sun-Times archivist who was attacked years ago and left for dead
- Wagner Moura as Dan Velazquez, Sun-Times reporter who helps Kirby track down her assailant
- Phillipa Soo as Dr. Jin-Sook Gwansun (Jinny), researcher at the Adler Planetarium and on Harper's hit list
- Chris Chalk as Marcus, Kirby's husband in one of her shifting realities
- Amy Brenneman as Rachel, Kirby's single mother
- Jamie Bell as Harper Curtis, serial killer, and Kirby's attacker

=== Recurring ===
- Christopher Denham as Leo Jenkins, Harper's friend from France during World War I
- Madeline Brewer as Klara Meiser, Harper's childhood friend from after World War I
- Karen Rodriguez as Julia Madrigal, one of Harper's murder victims
- Erika Alexander as Abby

== Episodes ==
No.	Title	Directed by	Written by	Original release date
1	"Cutline"	Michelle MacLaren	Silka Luisa	April 29, 2022
A young girl is sitting on the front stairs of a house. The automobiles parked at the curb and the intertitle indicate that it is 1964. A passerby strikes up a conversation with the girl. This mysterious man leaves a toy with her - although at first she refuses it - and walks away. The time advances to 1992 and we see the same girl, now an adult, Kirby (Elisabeth Moss), living with her mother, noting down details about her daily life, and harboring a plan to move to Florida. We see her going to her workplace – Chicago Sun-Times, where she works as an archivist. We meet Dan (Wagner Moura), one of the paper's reporters. He is following a recent criminal case for his next story. He notices that Kirby is interested in finding the culprit. He thinks that she is doing it just to raise her level of job profile, but she reveals that the girl assaulted in the case (Julia) has similar marks as hers (from the time when she was brutally attacked) and that makes her want to pursue it. After this conversation, they start investigating the case together. To confirm the details about her marks (to make his story more fact-driven), Dan takes Kirby to a medical examiner. The (female) ME starts to examine Kirby, but there is a sudden moment of disorientation, and the ME is now a man. Kirby panics and bolts from the room. This is the second sudden shift of reality in the episode. The examination shows that her claim about the marks is indeed true. Meanwhile, we also meet Jin-Sook (Phillipa Soo) who works at the local planetarium. She gets a visit from Harper, the mysterious man who met the young Kirby, who seemingly has aged little or not at all since scene 1. There are a few links in their encounters that connect Kirby’s case with hers. Towards the end of the episode, we see Jin-Sook getting strangled by Harper. Cut to Kirby going back to her building. She tries to open apartment 2B with her keys, but they don't fit. She knocks on the door, but instead of her mother, a strange man answers. Kirby is stunned but has enough presence of mind to take out her driver's license, according to which she lives not in 2B, but in 3B. She climbs the stairs to 3B and this time her key opens the door, but instead of her mother, she finds Marcus, her colleague from the newspaper.
2	"Evergreen"	Michelle MacLaren	Silka Luisa	April 29, 2022
We find out that Marcus and Kirby are married and that she does not live with her mother. On the investigation side, we see that Kirby tells Dan about how the killer left something in her body, and if the same has happened to Julia, there the killer may be the same. Dan goes to the crematorium and finds truth in her belief. Kirby wishes to be an anonymous source for this case. Meanwhile, he learns that this is not her actual name, which makes him question the viability of her claims. As a result, he confronts her about the name (Sharon Leads) change and gets to know the reason. They get on the same page and start investigating again. When both of them go to Julia’s house, Kirby finds a tape recording that reaffirms her notions that their killer is the same. Meanwhile, Dan comes across Harper, who appears to be an interested passerby. In the end, we see Harper sleeping on his bed with a greenish-tinted outline on his side.
3	"Overnight"	Daina Reid	Alan Page Arriaga	April 29, 2022
Dan awakens to find that he has been unconscious in a subway car. Blood is dripping down his hand. He tries to make sense of his situation. He goes back to his house. He finds his books all shuffled around, and puts them back in order. Meanwhile, Kirby goes through several computer files in the office and finds leads for an investigation. She assembles several cold cases from years before. Abby meets her and speaks to her about Dan’s drinking and to be wary around him. When Kirby confronts Dan about it, he tells her not to believe everything Abby tells her about him. Later they go through the physical evidence from the cold cases and find similarities with her and Julia’s cases. Kirby tries to persuade Dan to follow the leads, but he replies that they are police records that they are not supposed to have. However, it does guide their investigation in the right direction. Dan eventually discovers Kirby's notebook. When he confronts Kirby about it, she reveals her reality shifting. They subsequently leave the house, whereupon Harper gets inside and finds the evidence they were looking at. He quickly leaves. Meanwhile, Kirby follows a lead and goes to the local planetarium, where she learns that the person she is looking for still works there. Jin-Sook (from episode 1) meets her while leaving the planetarium. Kirby shows her the photo of the keys she brought with her (which belonged to Jin-Sook). She then asks Jin-Sook if she has ever heard of the other victims. Caught off guard and confused, Jin-Sook walks away.
4	"Attribution"	Daina Reid	Katrina Albright	May 6, 2022
5	"Screamer"	Elisabeth Moss	Kirsa Rein	May 13, 2022
6	"Bright"	Daina Reid	Naledi Jackson	May 20, 2022
7	"Offset"	Elisabeth Moss	Story by : Alan Page Arriaga; Teleplay by : Alan Page Arriaga & Naledi Jackson	May 27, 2022
8	"30"	Daina Reid	Silka Luisa	June 3, 2022

== Production ==
In May 2013, ahead of the novel's release, Media Rights Capital and Leonardo DiCaprio's Appian Way Productions acquired the rights to develop Lauren Beukes's The Shining Girls for television.

In July 2020, Apple gave a series order for Shining Girls, with Elisabeth Moss announced to star. The adaptation was created by Silka Luisa who is executive producer and showrunner. Moss and Lindsey McManus are executive producers under Moss's Love & Squalor Pictures. Leonardo DiCaprio and Jennifer Davisson are also executive producers under Appian Way Productions. The novel's author, Lauren Beukes, and Alan Page Arriaga are also executive producers. In February 2021, Wagner Moura joined the cast, with Jamie Bell joining in May 2021, and Phillipa Soo joining in July 2021. In August 2021, Amy Brenneman joined the cast of the series in a recurring role.

In May 2021, it was reported that Moss, Michelle MacLaren, and Daina Reid would direct the first season, with MacLaren set to direct the first two episodes, Moss set to direct another two episodes, and Reid set to direct the remaining four.

Principal photography began on May 24, 2021, and concluded on October 27, 2021, in Chicago, Illinois.

=== Differences from the novel ===
In Beukes' novel, the story is told from the point of view of each of Harper's victims. Show creator, Luisa made Kirby the principal protagonist and told the story through her eyes. Luisa felt that focusing on a single character's point of view made the show more compelling. She said, "With one character you see all the puzzle pieces ... You're sort of going through this maze with Kirby and discovering the mystery along with her."

While Beukes downplayed the character of Harper in her book, Luisa fleshed him out a little to make him more intriguing. She was careful to keep him out of the limelight, but said "[h]is humanness made him almost more unsettling." The show's interpretation of how time works is slightly different from that in the book. Luisa said that she imagined time as being a string that Harper moved up and down on. The closer he is to the top, the more Kirby is affected by his actions. Luisa explained that survivors remain connected to this string, and Shining Girls "is about cutting that string."

Luisa stressed that she never changed the book's message. "I think Lauren [Beukes] has a very specific worldview on grief and trauma that she presents and carrying that forward was really important."

Executive producer and lead actor, Moss remarked that unlike the book, in Shining Girls Kirby and Dan do not become romantically involved. Moss said that an eight-episode TV show is not enough time to adequately develop a love subplot. She added, "If you’re going to do it, we really wanted to do it well", and so instead they chose "to hint at it, and the possibility of it" rather than allow it to evolve.

Other differences between the show and the book have also been reported. In the show, Kirby is ten years older than in the book, and her position at the Chicago Sun-Times is an archivist rather than an intern. In the book the staff at the newspaper know of her attempted murder because they ran the story, whereas in the show Kirby changed her name from Sharon Leads to Kirby Mazrachi in order to keep her assault a secret.

The shifting realities that Kirby experiences in the show, her desk at work changing position, her cat at home becoming a dog, discovering that she is married, do not occur in the book. Some of the details of Harper's victims are different. Julia Madrigal is killed in 1990, not 1984, and she is connected to Leo, Harper's friend, who is a new character created by the show. The items Harper leaves in his victims are also different. In Kirby's case it is a matchbook, whereas in the book it is a monogrammed lighter.

== Release ==
The series premiered on April 29, 2022, on Apple TV+.

== Reception ==
The review aggregator website Rotten Tomatoes reported an 83% approval rating with an average rating of 7.1/10, based on 41 critic reviews. The website's critics consensus reads, "Shining Girls' time-bending conceit often induces a headache instead of thrills, but Elisabeth Moss' superb performance gives this mystery a riveting center of gravity." Metacritic, which uses a weighted average, assigned a score of 65 out of 100 based on 21 critics, indicating "generally favourable reviews".

Before the series premiere early reviews noted Moss’ performance as a highlight on the show.
