= Silka Luisa =

American television writer, producer, and showrunner

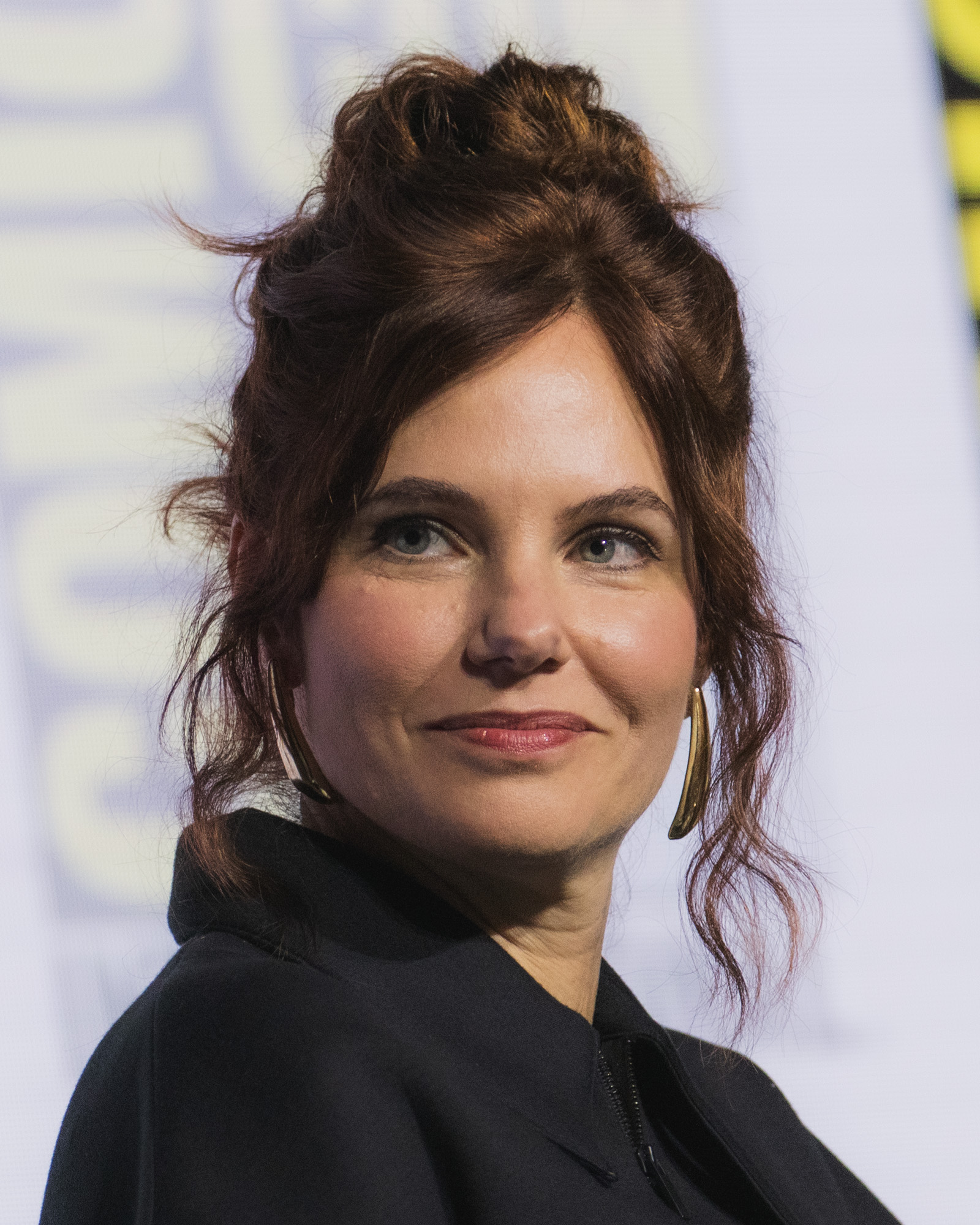
- Luisa in 2026
- Education: Columbia University School of the Arts (MFA)
- Occupations: Television writer; producer; showrunner
- Years active: 2018–present
- Notable work: Shining Girls (2022); Blade Runner 2099

Silka Luisa is an American television writer, producer, and showrunner who created the Apple TV+ series Shining Girls (2022) and the Amazon Prime Video series Blade Runner 2099.

== Early life and education ==
Luisa grew up in Miami, Florida. Her Dominican mother took her to psychics regularly as a child, and she has said that early exposure to the supernatural still shapes her writing. She has said reading Stephen King's memoir On Writing was what first convinced her that creative writing could be a viable career. She earned a Master of Fine Arts degree in film from Columbia University in 2011. In 2012, she participated in Film Independent's Project Involve fellowship in Los Angeles.

== Career ==
Luisa worked as a writer and consulting producer on Strange Angel (2018). Luisa was attached to write an installment in a planned film adaptation of R. L. Stine’s Fear Street series. She was also credited as a supervising producer on the Paramount+ series Halo (2022).

=== Shining Girls ===
In July 2020, Apple TV+ commissioned Shining Girls, a series adaptation of Lauren Beukes’ 2013 novel produced by MRC Television and Appian Way. Luisa developed the series, taking on the roles of writer, executive producer, and showrunner.

Reviews and interviews noted that the adaptation departs structurally from the novel, including a more centralized narrative perspective and changes to its treatment of time and reality. Luisa was also involved in post-production, working with editors and other department heads on the series’ final presentation.

On Twitter, author Stephen King praised the series as "exactly what streaming was made for," calling it scary, involving, and richly produced.

=== Blade Runner 2099 ===
In February 2022, it was reported that Luisa would write and executive produce Blade Runner 2099, a live-action limited series set in the Blade Runner franchise. Amazon formally ordered the series in September 2022, with Luisa serving as showrunner and Ridley Scott engaged as an executive producer.

The series is set after the events of Blade Runner 2049. Development involved collaboration with franchise creatives, including executive producer Ridley Scott and screenwriter Michael Green. Luisa has described the series as extending the franchise's "moral ambiguity" and thematic focus on replicants while maintaining continuity with the original films. Luisa built the character of Olwen (Michelle Yeoh) around her own longstanding empathy for the franchise's replicants, and modeled the character's arc on Rutger Hauer's in the original film, but told from the replicant's perspective.

Luisa described the series' visual approach as “sunshine noir,” contrasting its hot, sticky and chaotic Los Angeles with the rain-soaked and snowy settings of the earlier films. She described the series as a “rebirth” of the city and its characters, using hard sunlight, deep shadows, and neon to create a visual style that was both familiar and different from the earlier films.

Speaking at San Diego Comic-Con in July 2026, Luisa said the series was conceived from the outset as a self-contained, eight-episode limited series with no second season planned, comparing its intended shape to a film with a clear beginning, middle, and end; she added that the writers' room completed all eight scripts before production began. Prime Video confirmed the series would premiere on November 25, 2026.

== Filmography ==
=== Film ===
- To the Bone (2013; short film; writer)

=== Television ===
Key
†	Denotes television productions that have not yet been released

Year	Title	Creator	Writer	Executive producer	Notes
2016	The Wilding	Yes	Yes	Yes	Unaired pilot
2018	Strange Angel	No	Yes	Consulting	
2022	Halo	No	Yes	Supervising	
2022	Shining Girls	Yes	Yes	Yes	
2026	Blade Runner 2099 †	Yes	Yes	Yes	
