= Afterland =

2020 novel by Lauren Beukes

- First edition ebook cover
- Author: Lauren Beukes
- Language: English
- Genres: Science fiction
- Publisher: Penguin Random House (SA); Penguin Books (UK); Mulholland Books (US)
- Publication date: April 2020 (SA); May 2020 (UK); July 2020 (US)
- Publication place: United Kingdom
- Media type: Ebook, print
- ISBN: 978-1-4152-1059-8 (SA); 978-1-4059-2371-2 (UK); 978-0-316-26784-7 (US)

Afterland is a 2020 science fiction novel by South African writer Lauren Beukes. It takes place during "Manfall", a 2020 pandemic which has killed off almost all the world's men. Three years later In the United States, Cole and her twelve-year-old son, Miles are trying to flee to their home in South Africa. Miles is one of the few surviving males, and is sought after by US government researchers and boy traffickers.

Afterland was first published as an ebook in South Africa in April 2020 by Umuzi, an imprint of Penguin Random House South Africa, in the United Kingdom in May 2020 by Penguin Books, and in the United States in July 2020 by Mulholland Books. The first print editions of the book were published in September 2020 in the United Kingdom by Michael Joseph, and in August 2021 in the United States by Mulholland Books. Afterland was translated into French by Laurent Philibert-Caillat and published in France by Albin Michel in January 2022. The book was nominated for the 2021 Nommo Award for Best Speculative Fiction Novel by an African.

== Plot summary ==
In 2020, a human culgoa virus, a highly infectious strain of flu, spreads rapidly across the globe. The virus mutates into an aggressive prostate cancer and kills 99% of the world's male population. The pandemic is dubbed "Manfall", and most countries outlaw pregnancies and close their borders to safeguard future generations until a cure for the virus can be found.

Afterland begins in 2023 in the United States. Cole and her twelve-year-old son, Miles are trying to reach Florida and return to their home in South Africa. Miles is one of the few surviving males, and was quarantined with his mother at a Department for the Protection of Men facility in California. There he was probed and tested by researchers looking for a cure. Billie, Cole's sister, broke them out of the compound, but Billie had ulterior motive. She wants to keep her nephew to harvest his sperm and sell it on the black market. Now Cole and Miles are not only on the run from the US authorities, but also from Billie.

Cole disguises Miles as a girl and names him Mila. After days on the road, they encounter a bus full of "nuns" who have formed a cult they call the Sisters of the Church of All Sorrows. They believe that if women repent their sins, men will return. Cole and Mila join the travelling nuns in the hope of reaching the border safely.

== Critical reception ==
In a review in The New York Times, Stephen King described Afterland as "your basic neo-noir, coast-to-coast chase novel". He questioned whether American readers are ready for "a pandemic novel" at this point in their lives, but added "probably", considering that COVID-19 pales against Afterland's "manpocalypse" where boys are a "natural resource" and sperm bootlegging is illegal. King said Beukes's novel is "a smartly written thriller" that is full of "verve and mordant wit".

Carolyn Kellogg wrote in The Boston Globe that there is a lot going on in Afterland, and "it's ... a lot of fun". But she felt that the book is so full of action that some of its ideas get lost in the mix. Kellogg said the "racial dynamics" of Cole being a white woman and Miles a mixed-race boy is not explored, and the book's central theme, what the world ruled by woman would be like, is left largely untouched.

A reviewer at Publishers Weekly called Afterland an "intriguing and all too timely near-future thriller". They said that while the worldbuilding does not quite match that of Margaret Atwood's The Handmaid's Tale, where a pandemic leaves women infertile, "this is a worthy addition to the pandemic fiction subgenre". Kirkus Reviews described Afterland as a "propulsive and all-too-timely near-future thriller". The magazine said Cole and Miles's mother-and-son duo is the heart of this "harrowing tale", and added that "Beukes is a gifted storyteller who makes it thrillingly easy for readers to fall under her spell as she weaves a hypnotic vision of a fractured world without men."

Writing in New Scientist, Sally Adee called Afterland a "rare creature" that "neither shies away from big questions nor interesting answers". She said the book draws on themes from Alderman's The Power, James's The Children of Men and Le Guin's The Left Hand of Darkness, and it "shines as one of the best thought experiments of its kind". Adee stated that Beukes hints at the promise of a matriarchal society, but never quite gets there, "like mirages just over the horizon."

== Works cited ==
- Beukes, Lauren (2020). Afterland. Penguin Books. ISBN 978-1-4059-2371-2.
