= Blade Runner 2099 =

Upcoming American miniseries

- Promotional poster
- Genre: Action thriller; Cyberpunk; Drama; Science fiction
- Created by: Silka Luisa
- Based on: Characters from Do Androids Dream of Electric Sheep? by Philip K. Dick
- Starring: Michelle Yeoh; Hunter Schafer; Dimitri Abold; Lewis Gribben
- Music by: Leopold Ross
- Country of origin: United States
- Original language: English

Production
- Executive producers: Silka Luisa; Ridley Scott; Michael Green; Broderick Johnson; Andrew Kosove; Ben Roberts; Clayton Krueger; David W. Zucker; Cynthia Yorkin; Frank Giustra; Isa Dick Hackett; Tom Spezialy; Jonathan van Tulleken
- Cinematography: Rob Hardy; Ula Pontikos; Vanja Černjul; Damián García
- Editors: Fiona Colbeck; Leo Trombetta; Henk Van Eeghen
- Production companies: Scott Free Productions; J.A. Green Construction Corp.; Certified Pulp, Inc.; Electric Shepherd Productions; Alcon Television Group; Amazon MGM Studios; Sony Pictures Television

Original release
- Network: Amazon Prime Video

Blade Runner 2099 is an upcoming American science fiction television miniseries created by Silka Luisa for Amazon Prime Video. It is an installment in the Blade Runner franchise, serving as a sequel to the films Blade Runner (1982) and Blade Runner 2049 (2017). The franchise is based on Philip K. Dick's 1968 novel Do Androids Dream of Electric Sheep?.

In November 2021, Ridley Scott, who directed Blade Runner, announced that a pilot for the franchise's television spin-off had been written along with a series bible and initial plans for 10 episodes. In February 2022, the title Blade Runner 2099 was revealed for the series, which was being developed for Amazon Prime Video. Luisa joined as showrunner in addition to serving as a writer and executive producer, with additional writers to be brought in. Amazon ordered the series as a miniseries that September. Casting took place from May to August 2023, and filming was initially planned to begin in Belfast, but production was postponed due to the 2023 Writers Guild of America strike. After the strike ended, the production moved to Prague in early May 2024, with filming beginning there that June. Filming primarily took place at Barrandov Studios in Prague with additional filming in Barcelona, and it ended in late December 2024.

Blade Runner 2099 is scheduled to premiere on Amazon Prime Video on November 25, 2026.

== Premise ==
In 2099 Los Angeles, following an uprising, Replicants are the power brokers in the city while humans have become second-class citizens. Olwen, a Replicant Blade Runner nearing the end of her life, unites with her partner Cora, a human pretending to be a Replicant, to hunt down a gang of rogue Replicants.

== Cast and characters ==
=== Main ===
- Michelle Yeoh as Olwen, a Replicant Blade Runner who is in the final days of her life
- Hunter Schafer as Cora, Olwen's partner and a human pretending to be a Replicant
- Dimitri Abold
- Lewis Gribben

=== Recurring ===
- Katelyn Rose Downey
- Daniel Rigby
- Johnny Harris
- Amy Lennox
- Sheila Atim
- Matthew Needham
- Tom Burke
- Maurizio Lombardi
- Hugo Hamlet as Buster Friendly
- Wil Coban as Hodge

== Episodes ==
No.	Title	Directed by	Written by	Original release date
1	TBA	Jonathan van Tulleken	Silka Luisa	November 25, 2026
2	TBA	Jonathan van Tulleken	Silka Luisa	November 25, 2026
3	TBA	TBA	Kirsa Rein & Monika Revilla	November 25, 2026
4	TBA	TBA	Tom Spezialy & CK Kiechel	November 25, 2026
5	TBA	TBA	Teleplay by : CK Kiechel; Story by : Silka Luisa & CK Kiechel	November 25, 2026
6	TBA	TBA	Teleplay by : Kirsa Rein & Tom Spezialy & Silka Luisa; Story by : Tom Spezialy	November 25, 2026
7	TBA	TBA	Teleplay by : Silka Luisa & Ryan Willison; Story by : Silka Luisa & CK Kiechel	November 25, 2026
8	TBA	TBA	Silka Luisa	November 25, 2026

== Production ==
=== Development ===
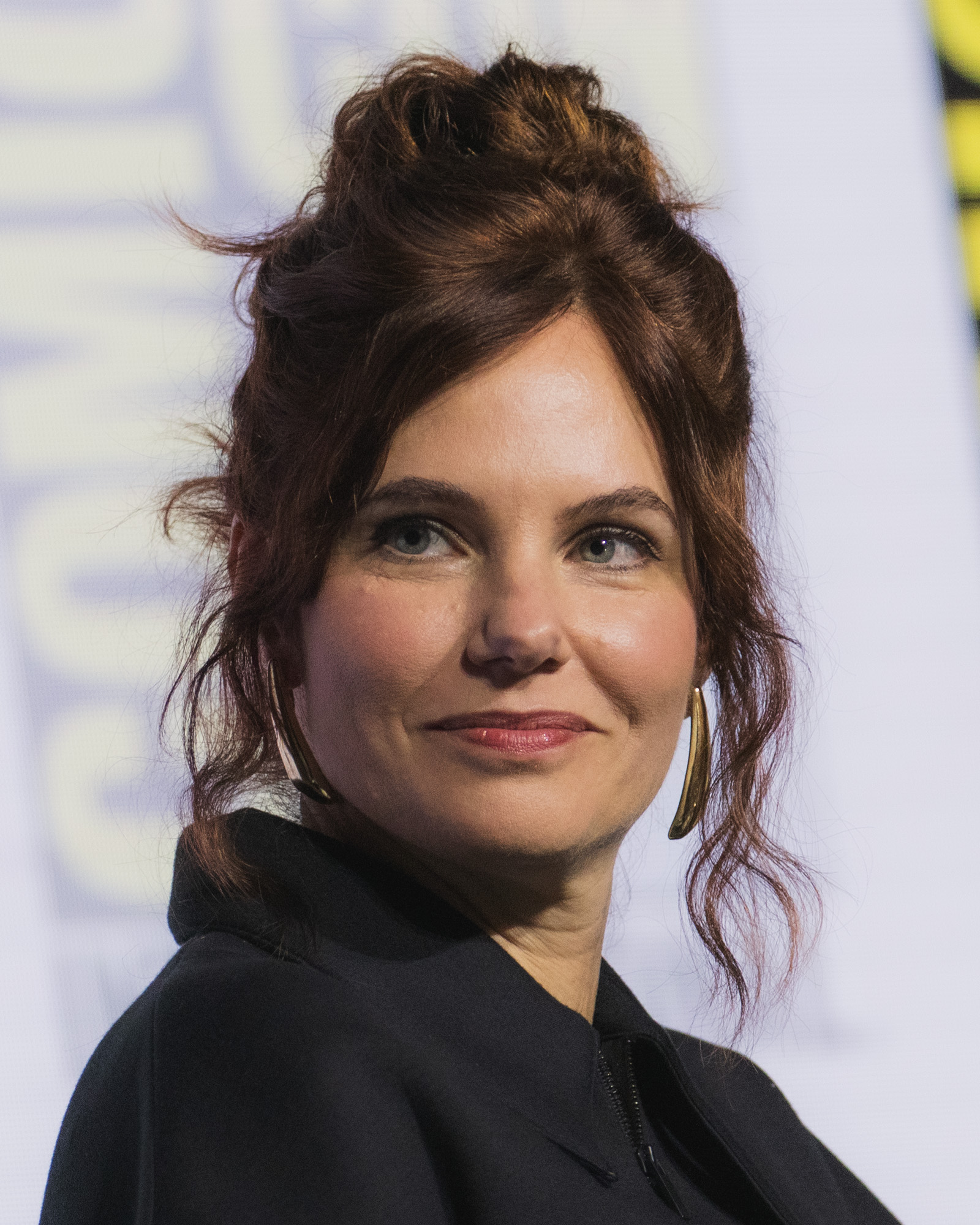
Silka Luisa, the series showrunner

In November 2021, Ridley Scott announced that a television pilot for a Blade Runner television spin-off had been written along with a series bible and initial plans for 10 episodes. In February 2022, the series title Blade Runner 2099 was revealed, and it was being developed for Amazon Prime Video. Silka Luisa joined as showrunner in addition to serving as a writer and executive producer for the show, with additional writers from shows such as Watchmen (2019) and Star Wars: The Acolyte (2024) to be brought in. Luisa consulted with Blade Runner 2049 (2017) writer Michael Green on the series pitch, subsequently referring to him as an "important part" of the development process for having provided guidance on developing the noir mystery for the series. Luisa's pitch for the series was as an inversion of the first Blade Runner film where replicants have taken the world over from humans rather than being subjugated by them.

Scott had considered directing in the development phase. Amazon ordered it as a miniseries in September 2022, and Tom Spezialy joined as a writing executive producer. In March 2023, Jeremy Podeswa was hired to serve as an executive producer and to direct the pilot episode. In February 2024, he exited the project due to scheduling conflicts, and Jonathan Van Tulleken was brought in to direct the first two episodes instead. Ariel Kleiman, Marcela Said, and Karena Evans were also hired to direct episodes of the series.

=== Casting ===
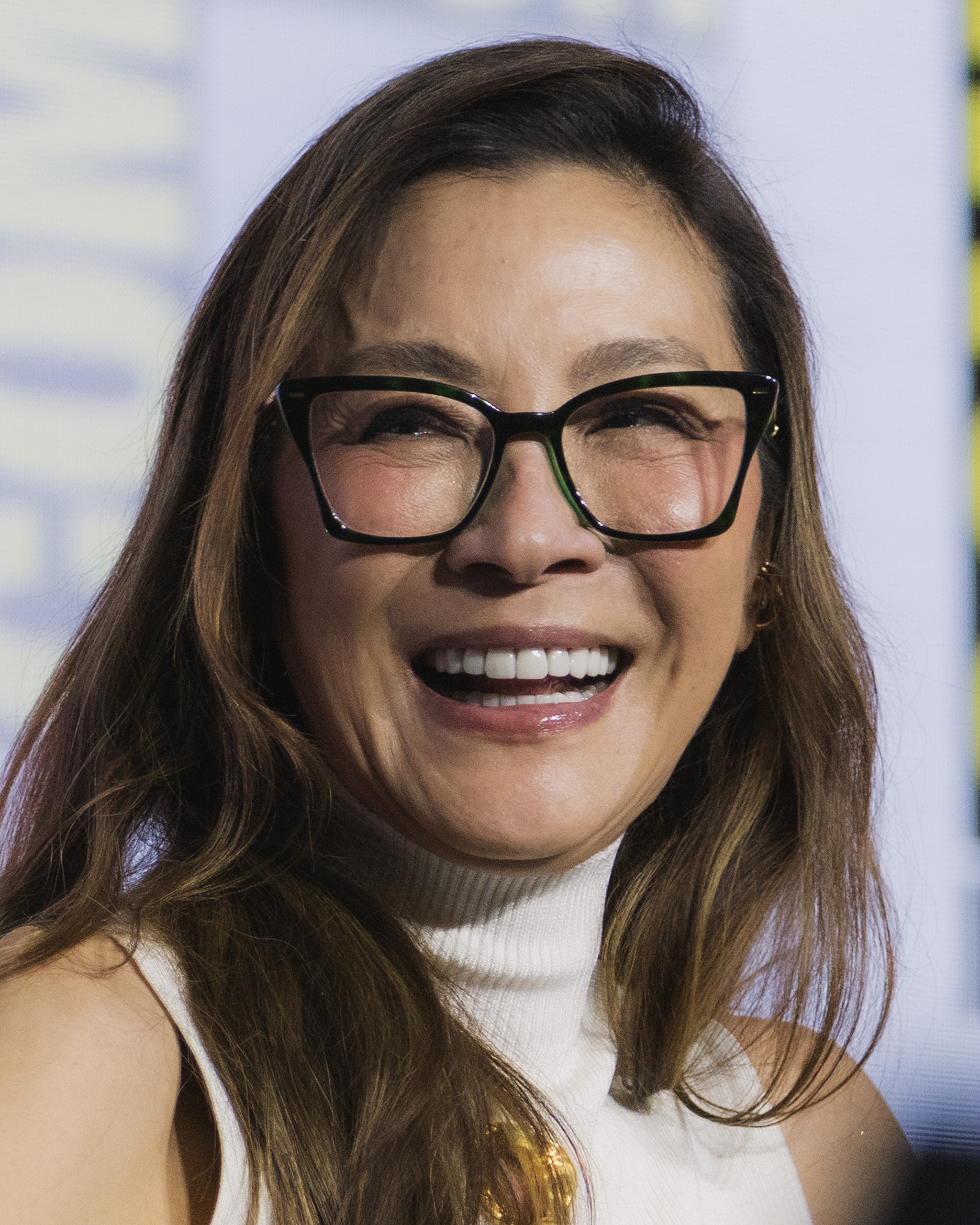
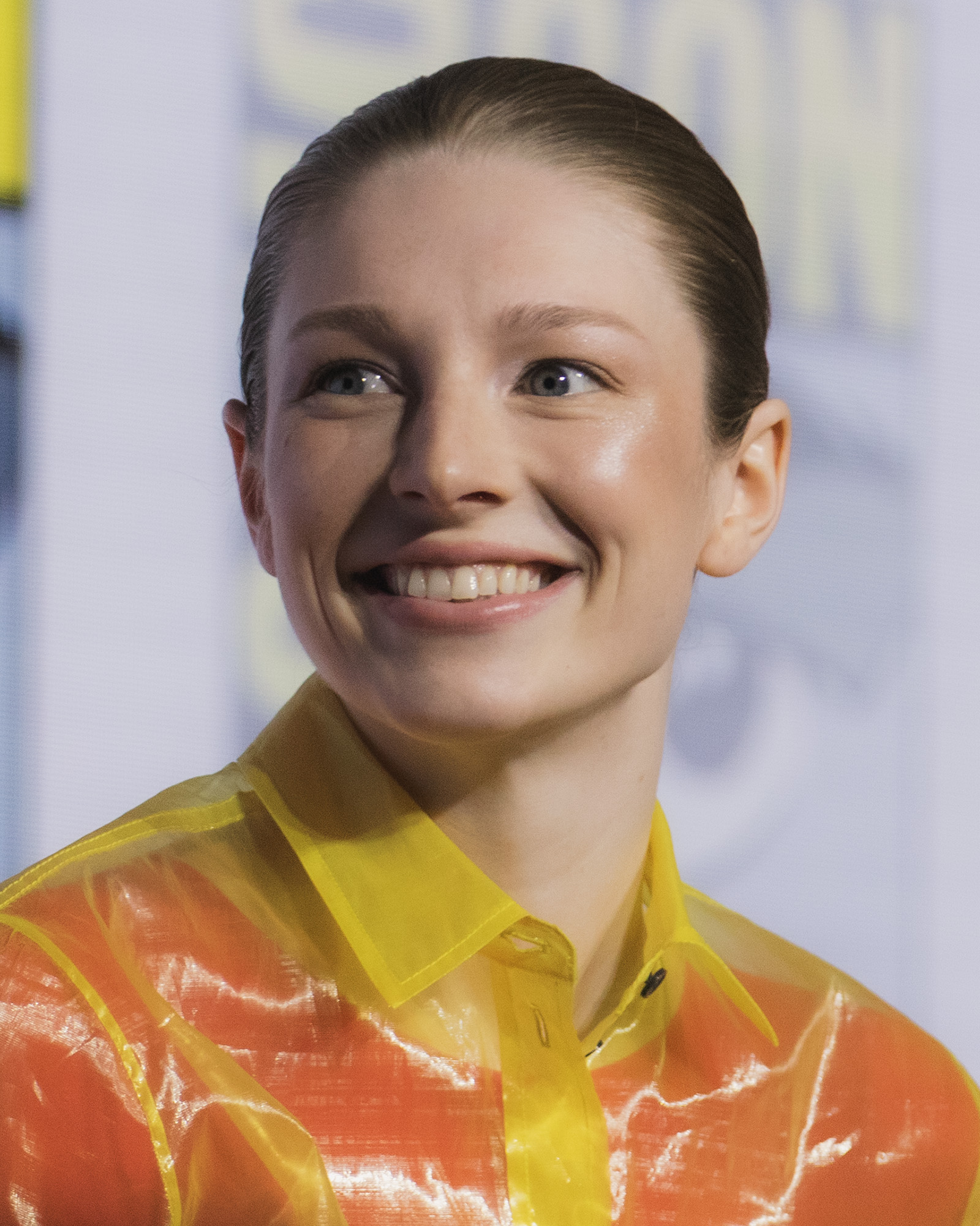
Co-leads Michelle Yeoh and Hunter Schafer

In May 2024, Michelle Yeoh joined the cast as Olwen. In June, Hunter Schafer joined the cast as the co-lead of the series. In July, Dimitri Abold and Lewis Gribben joined the cast in series regular role while Katelyn Rose Downey, Daniel Rigby, Johnny Harris, Amy Lennox, Sheila Atim, and Matthew Needham joined in recurring guest star roles. In August, Tom Burke and Maurizio Lombardi joined the cast in recurring roles.

=== Filming ===
The series was preparing to shoot in Belfast when the production was postponed due to the 2023 WGA strike. After the strike was over, the production ended up leaving Northern Ireland entirely in October 2023. Roughly £1.5 million had been spent of £4.1 million awarded by the Northern Ireland Screen fund, but all money would be returned to the NI Screen fund upon the production's exit from the country. This did leave "a gap in Northern Ireland's production schedule", according to NI Screen fund's chief executive, Richard Williams.

Production moved to Prague in early May 2024, with filming beginning there in June. Filming primarily took place at Barrandov Studios in Prague with additional filming in Barcelona. Rob Hardy, Ula Pontikos, Vanja Černjul, and Damián García served as cinematographers on the series. Filming concluded in late December 2024. In defining the look of Blade Runner 2099, Luisa referred to it as "sunshine noir" rather than the rainy, dark neon aethestic in Ridley Scott's Blade Runner (1982).

=== Post-production ===
Fiona Colbeck, Leo Trombetta, and Henk Van Eeghen are editors for the series.

== Release ==
Blade Runner 2099 is scheduled to premiere on Amazon Prime Video on November 25, 2026, with all eight episodes being released simultaneously. A trailer for the series was released on October 10, 2026 during New York Comic Con.

== See also ==
- List of adaptations of works by Philip K. Dick
