= The Shining Girls =

2013 novel by Lauren Beukes

- First South African edition cover
- Author: Lauren Beukes
- Cover artist: Joey Hi-Fi
- Language: English
- Genres: Thriller / science fiction
- Publisher: Random House Struik (SA); HarperCollins (UK); Mulholland Books (US)
- Publication date: 15 April 2013 (SA); 25 April 2013 (UK); 4 June 2013 (US)
- Publication place: South Africa
- Award: British Fantasy Award for Best Horror Novel (August Derleth Award)
- ISBN: 978-1-4152-0201-2 (SA); 978-0-00-746456-2 (UK); 978-0-316-21685-2 (US)

The Shining Girls is a science fiction thriller novel by South African author Lauren Beukes. The book centers on a mysterious drifter who murders the titular "shining girls" and one victim's attempts to expose him.

The Shining Girls was published on 15 April 2013 by the Umuzi imprint of Random House Struik in South Africa, on 25 April 2013 by HarperCollins in the United Kingdom, and on 4 June 2013 by Mulholland Books in the United States. HarperCollins had won the international rights to the book in a bidding war with several other publishers.

Unlike her previous novels, which are set in South Africa, The Shining Girls takes place in Chicago. Beukes said that because the story steps back and fourth through history, she felt South Africa would not be a suitable setting because "then it would become an Apartheid story." Beukes added that race issues appear frequently in her work, but "Apartheid would have overwhelmed everything else I wanted to do with the novel."

In 2013, The Shining Girls was short-listed for UK based Crime Writers' Association 2013 Goldsboro Gold Dagger award. In 2014, the book won the British Fantasy Society's award for Best Horror Novel.

== Plot ==
The Shining Girls follows Harper Curtis, a killer from Depression-era Chicago, who finds a key on the person of his latest victim, and uses it to unlock the door to a strange house. Inside, Harper discovers a room covered in seemingly random objects, each with a woman’s name attached. He quickly figures out that the house wants him to kill these women — the titular Shining Girls — who live at various times across the next 60 years. All Harper has to do is step out of the room with the house key and a copy of one of the objects — the originals remain inside the house — and he can visit any year between 1929 and 1993.

So begins Harper Curtis’ killing spree. He visits each of the Shining Girls when she is little and gives her a token item from the room, such as a baseball card or toy. Then, he leaps forward in time by a decade or more, murders the Shining Girl, and leaves a different woman’s token at the scene.

His luck changes when he brutally stabs Kirby Mizrachi in 1989 and leaves her for dead. Unbeknownst to Harper, Kirby survives the attempt on her life. And four years later, with her would-be killer still unidentified, she decides to go after him on her own.

Kirby takes a job working for Dan Velazquez, the journalist who covered her story for the Chicago Sun-Times. She’s upfront about wanting to track down her attacker, and she has an impossible theory — that the man who tried to kill her has been murdering women in Chicago for the last 60 years. Because Harper’s modus operandi (M.O.) includes leaving another woman’s token with each Shining Girl he kills, Kirby’s search uncovers anachronisms at the scenes of several Chicago murders, and she realizes that her own token — the 1985 My Little Pony figurine a strange man gave her in 1976 — is similarly displaced in time. Armed with this information, she enlists Dan’s help to research the pony’s history.

Meanwhile, Harper is hunting Kirby once again, having read one of her articles from 1993. When someone tips her off that a man is looking for her, Kirby turns the tables on Harper and pursues him all the way to the house. After seeing the token room, she tries reporting Harper and the house to the police, but they find nothing amiss inside.

Kirby approaches Dan once more and convinces him to break into the house with her. While Dan fends off Harper in 1929, Kirby gathers the tokens and prepares to burn them. Harper critically injures Dan and returns to the house, arriving just in time to see Kirby set the items ablaze. The novel ends with Kirby shooting Harper and leaving him to die in the burning house while she and Dan escape.

== Criticism and review ==
The Shining Girls received positive to mixed reviews from critics.

Writing for NPR, American writer and critic Alan Cheuse called The Shining Girls "a triumph" and "a marvelous narrative feat that spans the history of Chicago from the 1930s to the 1990s". He complimented Beukes on her in-depth research into Chicago's history, and described the plot as a "well-made, though extremely complex temporal creation". A reviewer in the National Post described The Shining Girls as "a thoroughly satisfying thriller" and said that Kirby's charm is "irresistible and irrepressible", while Harper reminds one of the 1890s Chicago serial killer H. H. Holmes.

American writer Julia Keller wrote in a review of the book in the Chicago Tribune that she was pleased that The Shining Girls deviates from traditional serial-killer fiction in that it does not glorify the killer. Beukes presents Harper as "greedy and seedy and opportunistic", rather than "scintillatingly brilliant and alluringly damaged". While the book's time-travel theme "stretches scientific plausibility", Keller said that the book's strength comes from Beukes's "audacious imaginative vision", and that she has made "delicate and redemptive magic" out of "something horrific and inexplicable".

Simmy Richman wrote in The Independent that while the book has good ideas, it is "ultimately another high-concept novel that suffers in the execution". He said that the back-and-forth time travel results in the story "feel[ing] all over the place". Richman added that Beukes's characterization of Harper's victims was good, but felt that she does not give the killer the same attention. American author Charles Finch writing in a review in USA Today also felt that The Shining Girls is "not entirely successful in its execution", but added that because Beukes is "so profusely talented – capable of wit, darkness, and emotion on a single page", the book should still be a "blockbuster". Finch said that while Beukes "successfully defines and limits her story's magical elements", the magic "come[s] apart at the seams" during the final showdown between Kirby and Harper.

In a review in The New York Times, American journalist and critic Janet Maslin wrote that Beukes has made The Shining Girls more than "a standard serial-killer story" by "load[ing] it with acrobatic twists", and said it is a "strong contender for the role of this summer's universal beach read". Maslin added that a strong point of the book is "the emotional effect of the victims' unusual virtue" that Beukes creates, but complained about the book's lack of information about Harper. Maslin also criticized the fact that all the story's "occult power" rests in the House, which "has a mind of its own, but we never find out how it works". Alison Flood wrote in a review in The Guardian that if you accept Beukes's "time-travel conceit", The Shining Girls is a page-turner that will "take some beating this summer". Flood defended Beukes's decision not to explain how the House works, saying that "The [H]ouse just is", and that Harper's underdeveloped character is what makes him an enigma. She complimented Beukes on her victims, calling them "vivid, glowing characters", and described Kirby as "one of the sarkiest, most resilient heroines you're likely to meet this year".

== Adaptations ==
In May 2013, it was announced that MRC and Appian Way, Leonardo DiCaprio's production company, have bought the television rights to The Shining Girls. In July 2020, Apple announced that it green lit a straight-to-series order for Shining Girls, launching exclusively on Apple TV+, with Elisabeth Moss set to star and executive produce. In February 2021, Wagner Moura was cast to lead opposite Moss. Production on the series began in Chicago in May 2021. It premiered on April 29, 2022.

== Awards ==
- 2013 – UJ Prize for South African Writing in English
- 2013 – RT Thriller of the Year
- 2013 – Exclusive Books' Readers Choice Award
- 2014 – The Strand Magazine Critic's Best Novel Award
- 2014 – British Fantasy Award for Best Horror Novel
