= Lauren Beukes =

South African writer

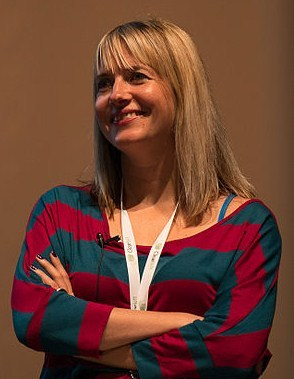
- Lauren Beukes at dConstruct, 2012.
- Born: 5 June 1976 (age 50); Johannesburg, South Africa
- Occupation: Writer
- Writing career
- Period: (2005–present)
- Genres: Science fiction; Literary fiction; Urban fantasy; Dystopian fiction; Non-fiction
- Website: laurenbeukes.com

Lauren Beukes (born 5 June 1976) is a South African novelist, short story writer, journalist and television scriptwriter.

== Early life ==
Lauren Beukes was born 5 June 1976. She grew up in Johannesburg, South Africa. She attended Roedean School in Johannesburg, and has an MA in creative writing from the University of Cape Town. Beukes wrote her first novel as a teenager. Although unpublished, she later described it as something she "moved continents with" but decided to leave in a drawer. She worked as a freelance journalist for ten years, including two years in New York and Chicago.

== Career ==
=== Books ===
She is the author of The Shining Girls, a novel about a time-traveling serial killer and the survivor who turns the hunt around. It was published on 15 April 2013 by the Umuzi imprint of Random House Struik in South Africa, on 25 April 2013 by HarperCollins in the United Kingdom, and on 4 June 2013 by Mulholland Books in the United States. HarperCollins had won the international rights to the book in a fierce bidding war with several other publishers.

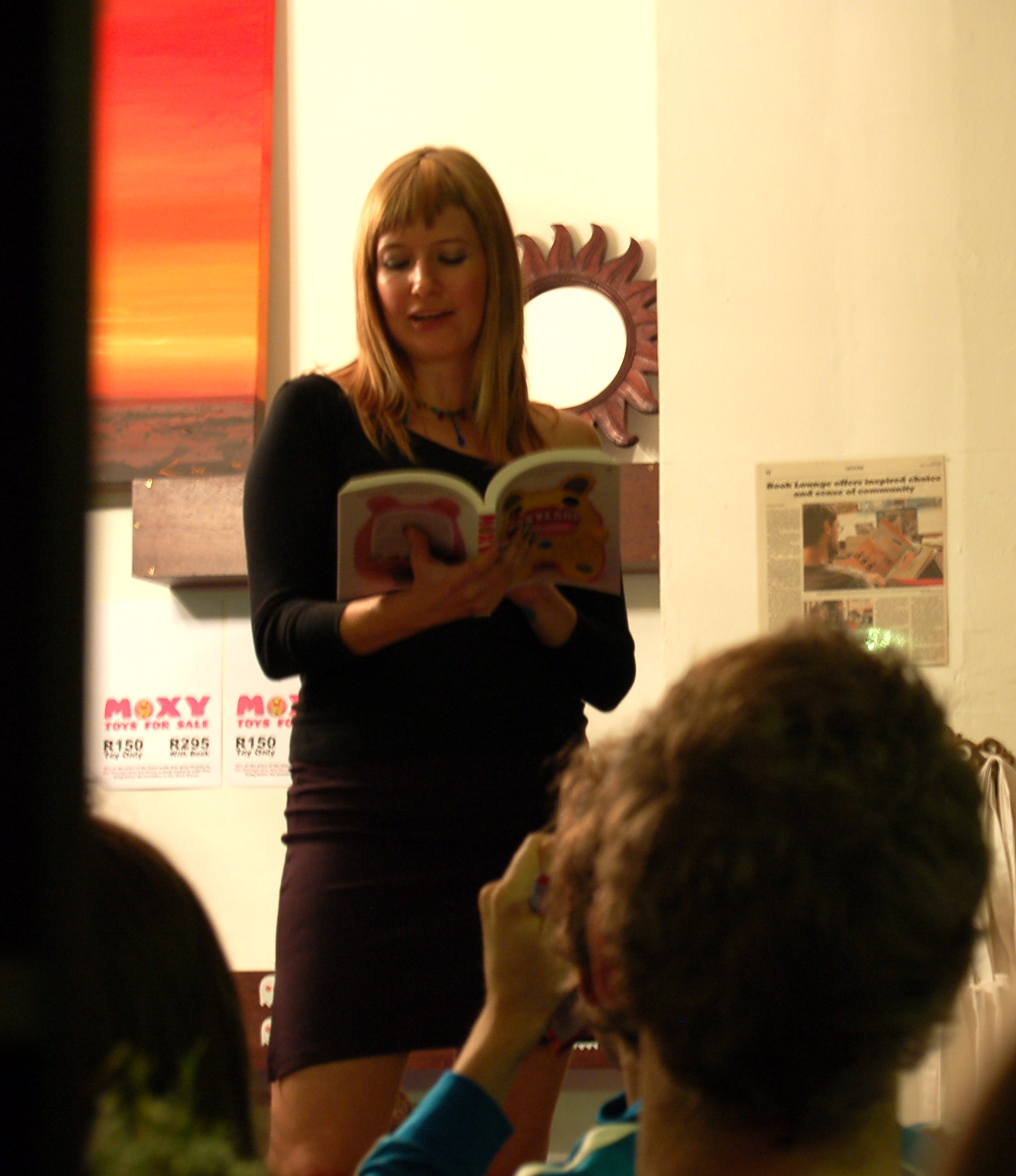
Beukes at the launch of Moxyland in 2008

The Shining Girls won The Strand Magazine Critic's Best Novel Award, the RT Thriller of the Year, Exclusive Books' Readers Choice Award, and South Africa's most prestigious literary award, the University of Johannesburg Prize. The TV rights for the novel have been acquired by MRC and Leonardo DiCaprio's Appian Way according to The Hollywood Reporter.

Her previous novel, Zoo City, a hardboiled thriller about crime, magic, the music industry, refugees and redemption set in a re-imagined Johannesburg won the 2011 Arthur C. Clarke Award, and the 2010 Kitschies Red Tentacle for best novel. It was short-listed for the 2010 BSFA Award for best novel, the 2011 World Fantasy award for best novel, the 2010–2011 University of Johannesburg Creative Writing Prize, the M-Net Literary Awards, the Nielsen's Booksellers' Choice Award 2011 and long-listed for South Africa's Sunday Times Fiction Prize 2011 and the 2012 International Dublin Literary Award. The cover artwork received the 2010 BSFA award for best art. The novel has also been short-listed for the Grand Prix de l'Imaginaire in France for best foreign novel, best translation by Laurent Philibert-Caillat and best cover by Joey Hi-Fi.

The film rights have been optioned by South African producer, Helena Spring.

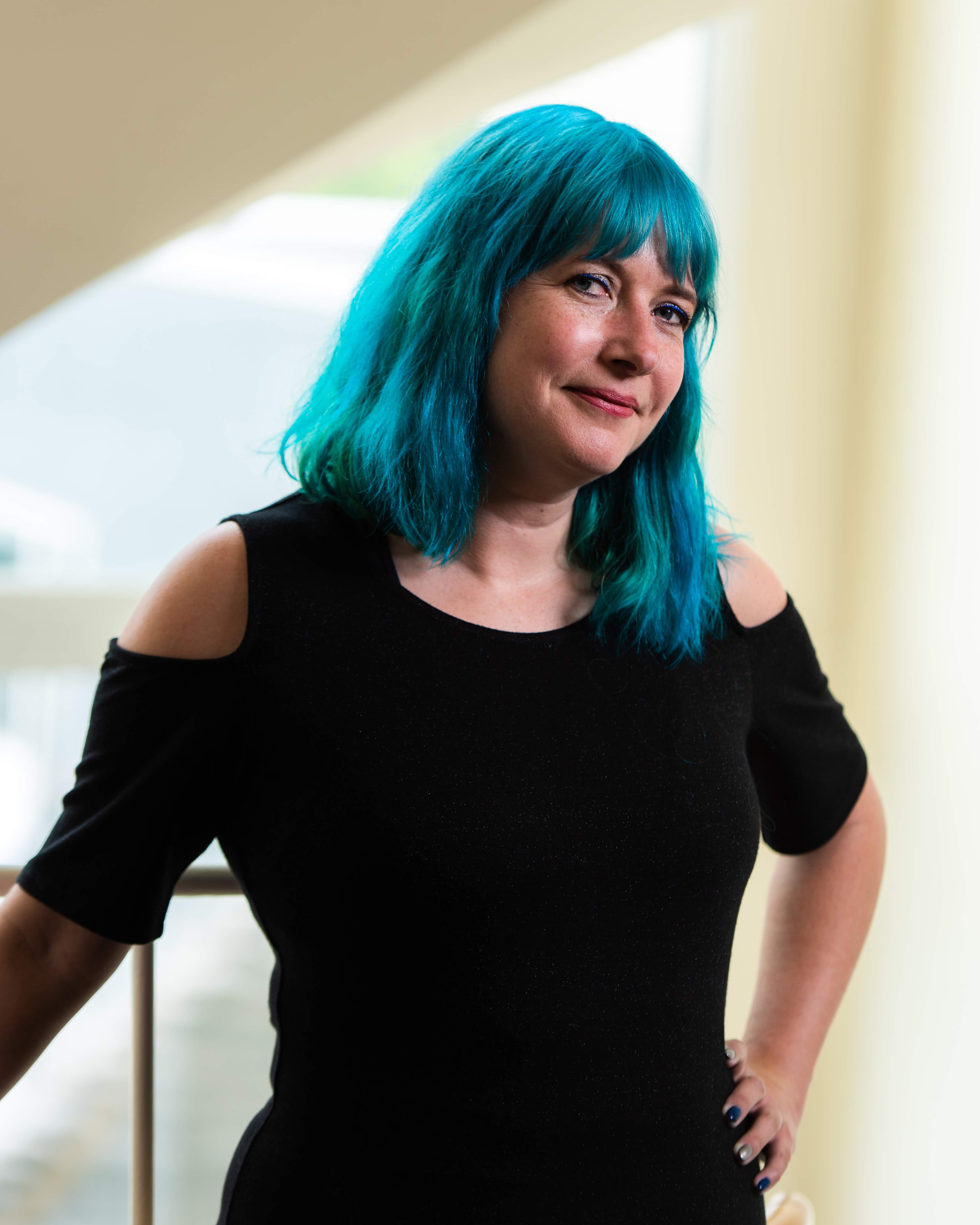
Lauren Beukes as guest of honour in Finncon 2018

Her first novel was Moxyland, a cyberpunk novel set in a future Cape Town. Both books were first published in South Africa by Jacana Publishing and released internationally by Osprey Publishing's Angry Robot imprint.

Her first book, the non-fiction Maverick: Extraordinary Women from South Africa's Past (Oshun 2004) was long-listed for the 2006 Sunday Times Alan Paton Award.

She has published short stories in several anthologies including "Further Conflicts" (NewCon Press 2011), Home Away (Zebra 2010), Touch: Stories of Contact (Zebra 2009), Open: Erotic Stories from South African Women Writers (Oshun 2008), FAB (Umuzi 2007), African Road: New Writing from Southern Africa (New Africa Books 2005), 180 Degrees: New Fiction by South African Women Writers (Oshun 2006), and Urban 03 (New Africa Books 2005).

In July 2014, Beukes published a new novel called Broken Monsters, which is set in Detroit, Michigan.

Her first short fiction collection, Slipping: Stories, Essays, and Other Writing (Tachyon Publications), was released in October 2016.

In 2023, she published Bridge.

=== Film and television ===
As head writer for Clockwork Zoo, she was part of the development team that created South Africa's first half-hour animated TV series, URBO: The Adventures of Pax Afrika. She also wrote 12 episodes of the Playhouse Disney show, Florrie's Dragons for Wish Films and episodes of the animated series Mouk for French production company Millimages.

She directed a feature-length documentary on Miss Gay Western Cape called Glitterboys & Ganglands. The film has shown at various festivals including the Atlanta Film Festival, Encounters, Out in Africa and won best LGBT film at the San Diego Black Film Festival.

She was also one of the writers, together with Ben Trovato and Tumiso Tsukudu on the pilot of controversial ZA News, a Spitting Image-style satire show with puppets based on the work of South African cartoonist, Zapiro. The pilot was commissioned by the SABC but never broadcast.

Her novel, The Shining Girls, was adapted into a television series, Shining Girls by MRC and Appian Way Productions. It premiered on Apple TV+ on 29 April 2022.

=== Journalism ===
As a journalist, her articles have been published in a wide range of local and international magazines including The Hollywood Reporter, Nature Medicine and Colors as well as The Sunday Times Lifestyle, Marie Claire, Elle, Cosmopolitan and SL Magazine.

She won "Best Columnist Western Cape" in the Vodacom Journalist of the Year Awards in 2007 and 2008.

== Comics ==
Beukes made her comics writing debut with "All The Pretty Ponies" in Vertigo's Strange Adventures one-shot. She also wrote "The Hidden Kingdom", an arc of Fairest (issues #8–13), a spin-off of Bill Willingham's Eisner Award-winning Fables series, and a Durham Red story for 2000 AD's 40th anniversary special issue. Her series Survivors' Club, illustrated by Dale Halvorsen and Ryan Kelly was published by Vertigo October 2015 – June 2016 for nine issues. Before its cancellation the series was under development as a TV series.

== Activism ==
In 2025, Beukes and Jeannette Ng set up "The Genre Creators for Trans Rights Auction", with authors including Olivie Blake, Patrick Rothfuss, Ali Hazelwood and Adrian Tchaikovsky, as well as the estate of Terry Pratchett, donating items to raise money for South Africa's Triangle Project and the UK's Good Law Project to work for trans rights in the wake of both funding pressures on South African queer rights organisations, and the UK Supreme Court's ruling on the meaning of sex in the Equality Act 2010.

== Bibliography ==
- Maverick: Extraordinary Women from South Africa's Past (2004)
- Moxyland (2008)
- Zoo City (2010)
- The Shining Girls (2013)
- Broken Monsters (2014)
- Slipping (short story collection, 2016)
- Afterland (2020) – Originally titled Motherland
- Bridge (2023)

=== Short fiction ===
Beukes has published short fiction in various collections:

- Urban '03 (2004)
- African Road: New Writing from South Africa (2005)
- 180 Degrees: New Fiction by South African Women Writers (2006)
- FAB (2007)
- Open: Erotic Stories from South African Women Writers (2008)
- Touch: Stories of Contact (2009)
- Home Away: 24 Hours, 24 Cities, 24 Authors (2010)
- Pandemonium: Stories of the Apocalypse (2011)

=== Other ===
- Foreword for Jeff Noon – Vurt, 20th anniversary edition (2013)
- Foreword for Alan Moore – The Ballad of Halo Jones (2013)
