= Moxyland =

2013 novel by Lauren Beukes

- First Edition (South Africa)
- Author: Lauren Beukes
- Language: English
- Genre: Futuristic / Science fiction
- Publisher: Jacana Media (South Africa); Angry Robot (UK)
- Publication date: 2008 (SA & UK); 2010 (US)
- Publication place: South Africa
- Pages: 377
- ISBN: 978-0-857-66004-6 (UK)

Moxyland is a cyberpunk dystopian novel written by South African author, Lauren Beukes. The book was published in 2008.

Moxyland is narrated by four different characters, and each chapter focuses on one of the narrators and her or his own experience living in near futuristic Cape Town, South Africa and under an oppressive and pervasive government and media.

Overall, Moxyland was well received. It was nominated for Sunday Times Fiction Prize.

== Characters ==
Lauren Beukes dives into the lives of four main characters to exemplify the wide spectrum of social hierarchies that reside in Moxyland. Through these four characters, Beukes illustrates a society where technology rules with an iron fist and in doing so shows the limitations of freedom. Beukes uses first person to highlight central themes throughout the novel.

Kendra

Kendra, an art school dropout reinvented as shiny brand ambassador, known as a sponsor baby. Ghost girl (7)” is an artistic photographer with hopes of exposing her work. Kendra voluntarily becomes sponsored by a corporation. She is injected with experimental nanobots that enhance her physical and mental abilities. They are even supposed to stop any illnesses so that she will never be sick again. A side effect of the nanotechnology is that it makes Kendra addicted to a high-tech soft drink called Ghost. A glowing green tattoo in the shape of the corporation's logo appeared after injection that showed she was branded. Beukes uses Kendra's story to reveal the overwhelming power that technology has over Moxyland inhabitants because essentially Kendra becomes a walking advertisement.

Lerato

Lerato is a young female corporation worker who seems to have figured out the way in Moxyland. Lerato, unlike the rest of the main characters, lives comfortably in the cushions of corporate Moxyland. Lerato's autonomic success in Moxyland can be described as a rags-to-riches story. She became an orphan after her parents died of AIDs. She attended a corporation school for AIDs orphans and then was hired to work at a corporation. Her skills allow her to climb the professional ladder, and she uses her computer skills and inside job to aid Tendeka's cause.

Tendeka

Tendeka is a passionate, idealistic revolutionary figure in Moxyland. He is against corporations and corruption. He and Ash, his lover, create and conduct projects to help provide food and shelter to street children in Cape Town. Tendeka even goes as far as pretending to be married to a young pregnant girl in order to make a statement. His drive to promote change shows that not all people (mostly outsiders) are happy with the system. Tendeka refuses to accept the superior power of technology in this society. However, he sometimes contradicts himself because he fears being disconnected from society, even though he believes the way society is structured is unjust. Tendeka, along with the help of skyward*, participates in underground revolutionary events attempting to end technological totalitarianism in Moxyland.

Toby

Toby plays a role in all the other characters’ lives, whether positively or negatively, due to his narcissistic tendencies. This makes him a vital part to the progression of the novel. He runs a 24-hour vlog stream called “Diary of Cunt” which streams what he is going through. At times, he creates or looks for chaos so that his life can appear interesting, and so that he can be recognized by the media. This is difficult to do in Moxyland because citizens are constantly being bombarded with advertisements, therefore it is difficult to stand out. Toby uses his BabyStrange media coat, which records anything that crosses his path, to get film for his vlog. Toby is self-centered and his course of actions only emphasizes his concern for own personal gain. He eventually becomes involved in “real-life” gaming.

Skyward*

Skyward* is an anonymous omnipotent power in Moxyland, an online game. Skyward* aids Tendeka by supplying technology and inside information. Skyward* is a close ally to Tendenka and a strong supporter of Tendeka's cause.

== Setting ==
Moxyland is set in a futuristic Cape Town, South Africa. The city is plagued by various economic, ecological, medical, racial, and socio-economic issues, and the populace is divided into tiers based on one's class, health, race, and ownership of a cellphone and a SIM card. A SIM card in a cellphone is a device, which contains one's bank account, personal information, and records. Without either a cellphone or a SIM card, one is cut off or “disconnected” from food, water, shelter, or any form of communication and transportation. Using a combination of this kind of technology and the media, the government maintains control over the metropolis and people.

The advancement of technology in Moxyland focuses mainly on digital technology and biotechnology. As aforementioned, one's identity is contained in a SIM card, as well as an avatar. Online and virtual gaming are one of the hedonistic trends promoted by the media and used to distract the affluent and privileged upper class from the reality of AIDS, apartheid, and the social stratification created by technology and the ownership of a cellphone and a SIM card.

Nanotechnology and genetic engineering are two forms of biotechnology popular with the people and pets alike. The former, however, is utilized by the corporations, government, and police to serve much darker purposes. Corporations hire people as test subjects for cosmetic and medical nanotechnology, and then dispose of them as soon as the next trend comes in. For the government and police, nanotechnology is another form of control. Genetically engineered and injected with nanotechnology, dogs called Aitos are used as a weapon to enforce the law and inspire fear in the people.

In Moxyland, because of the corporate culture, government, and technology, the narrators are forced to either conform or live on the fringes and utilize the same technology against the system or solely for themselves.

== Plot ==
Moxyland follows four protagonists in a near future South African dystopian society. The society relies heavily on technology. Citizens use SIMs in cell phones to access their homes, money, jobs, various areas of Cape Town, and is also used as punishment. If a citizen commits a crime, he/she can be “disconnected” which means “no phone, no service, [and] no life.” Being disconnected essentially means to be an outsider of society. The technologically advanced society, where online presence is important to life, considers this form of punishment worse than imprisonment.

Throughout the novel, the main characters’ (Toby, Tendeka, Kendra, and Lerato) actions reflect the fear of being disconnected. Tendeka, an idealistic anti-corporation activist, is against the amount of power the government/ corporation has. By being dependent on technology, the government and corporations have a substantial amount of control over the fate of the citizens. The citizens’ power is limited due to this relationship. Although Tendeka fears disconnection, he enlists the help of Toby to protest against the government through a variety of methods. Most of these methods require the technological assistance of Lerato, a computer programmer who works for a major corporation.

While Tendeka tries to change the way society works, Kendra is sponsored by a corporation. She consented to having nanobots injected into her body which claims to prevent aging and prevent sickness. The nanotechnology makes her addicted to a soft drink called Ghost. Unlike the other characters, Kendra does not try to fight against the way dystopian society works. She instead takes pictures of what is around her and does not take a stand. However, as the story progresses she is brought into the chaos due to Tendeka's orders from skyward*; an online contact from a game.

Tendeka faithfully follows through believing his actions will provoke change, instead things take a turn for the worse and one begins to wonder who really is in charge. As the mechanics of the government's system is revealed, the true purpose of the government is exposed.

== Themes ==
Biotechnology

A prominent theme in Moxyland is biotechnology. The book starts out with Kendra being given some type of booster that basically turns her into a superhuman. Instantaneously Kendra is dehumanized through nanotechnology and transformed into a mindless experiment with an abnormally resilient immune system. This scene signifies the power that biotechnology pertains over Moxyland. Kendra's initial curiosity to this dystopian highlights that she is an outsider whom can only be controlled through means of biotechnology. The nanotechnology inside Kendra slowly eats away at her until she falls submissive to the futuristic technological control in Moxyland. Biotechnology is concurrently found in police dogs named Aitos. The fact that inhabitants are protected and enforced through bioengineered entities reinforces the theme of biotechnology as a method of authority. Beukes cleverly combines human traits and technology to illustrate how easily a society can become mechanized.

Dystopian society

The setting of Moxyland is a dystopian society in which technology is used as a means of control. Beukes creates a futuristic world that initially seems far removed from our own, but as the novel unfolds, the similarities between Moxyland and modern society become increasingly apparent. The government maintains control over nearly every aspect of people's lives, leaving citizens with little privacy or freedom. The gap between the wealthy and the poor continues to grow, with the rich benefiting while the lower and middle classes struggle to get by. The society is governed by an authoritarian regime that uses technology to monitor and regulate its citizens. Cell phone and internet activity are closely surveilled to ensure that people behave according to the government's expectations.[1][2]

Social hierarchy

Social hierarchy is one of the central themes of Moxyland with most of the characters laid out in a fairly linear progression of status. Some of the characters, like Toby and Lerato, have naturally high status, while others such as Kendra were granted somewhat of an elevated status due to her drug infusion. However, Kendra seems ironically out of place in “high class” environments. The opposite side of the spectrum includes the masses of less fortunate children and citizens who are abused by the system. People like Tendeka try to support their movement against the tyrannical dystopia, which creates more tension and confusion. Tendeka has a family and could be a fairly respectable member of society but instead crosses the line into the impoverished side to offer a helping hand. This blending of societal castes is evident throughout the book and creates interesting comparisons of characters when juxtaposed in the story.

Another frequently cited theme is segregation. The world in which Moxyland is set divides most of the characters in the book, named or not, either into a privileged, upper class setting or a low-life caste with little rights. This plays in well with the underlying messages Beukes sends about race and breaking stereotypes in the novel. Moxyland ’s segregation is not necessarily by race but by socioeconomic status, yet it serves much the same point. The society is divided so much that rebellion is inevitable. Speaking to the injustices of authority in segregation, Beukes makes the point that a unified society can communicate and cooperate much more efficiently than a divided one.

== Criticism and reviews ==
Moxyland was nominated for the South African Sunday Times Fiction Prize. Overall the book was well received in the cyberpunk genre. Some reviews state that it surpassed other attempts cyberpunk dystopian novels made. The message of the novel is considered dark, but was delivered with enthusiasm and wit. The plot of the story is seen as feasible, and its chaotic complexion serves to as a warning of what could happen in the future if society's everyday indulgences are treated with too much disdain. Although Moxyland is considered a traditional cyberpunk book, reviews suggest it is refreshing and thought-provoking. Most reviews rave about the novel, but still touch on some flaws. Beukes wrote the novel in first person, yet some found the characters lacking in a distinct voice, which took away from the purpose of the literary technique. Considering Moxyland is Beukes first novel, reviewers did not consider it a huge impact to the overall experience and message of the novel.
