= Home Alone (disambiguation) =

Home Alone is a 1990 American Christmas comedy film directed by Chris Columbus.

Home Alone may also refer to:

== Film franchise ==
- Home Alone (franchise)
  - Home Alone: Original Motion Picture Soundtrack, from the first film
  - Home Alone (video game), 1991
  - Home Alone (2006 video game), PS2

== Television ==
- I Live Alone (TV program), a South Korean variety show also known as Home Alone

=== Episodes ===
- "Home Alone" (The Boondocks), 2007, season 2, episode 10
- "Home Alone" (Doctors), 2004, season 5, episode 87
- "Home Alone" (The Inbetweeners), 2010, season 3, episode 5
- "Home Alone" (Johnny Bravo), 2004, season 4, episode 4
- "Home Alone", a 1994 Sooty & Co. episode, season 2, episode 11

== Music ==
- "Home Alone" (song), by R. Kelly, 1998
- "Home Alone", a 2016 song by Ansel Elgort
- "Home Alone", a 2004 song by Special D. from the album Reckless
