= Home Alone (franchise) =

Film franchise

- Official franchise logo
- Created by: John Hughes
- Original work: Home Alone (1990)
- Owner: 20th Century Studios
- Years: 1990–present

Films and television
- Films: Home Alone (1990); Home Alone 2: Lost in New York (1992); Home Alone 3 (1997); Home Sweet Home Alone (2021)
- Television films: Home Alone 4 (2002); Home Alone: The Holiday Heist (2012)

Games
- Video games: Home Alone (1991); Home Alone 2: Lost in New York (1992); Home Alone (2006)

Audio
- Soundtrack: Home Alone (1990)

Home Alone (Note: Stylized as HOME ALONe) is a series of American Christmas family comedy films originally created by John Hughes. Chris Columbus directed Home Alone (1990) and Home Alone 2: Lost in New York (1992), Raja Gosnell directed Home Alone 3 (1997), Rod Daniel directed Home Alone 4 (2002), Peter Hewitt directed Home Alone: The Holiday Heist (2012) and Dan Mazer directed Home Sweet Home Alone (2021). The films revolve around the adventures of children who find themselves alone during the holiday season, faced with the challenge of defending their family's house or themselves from invading burglars and criminals.

The first three films were released theatrically by 20th Century Fox, while the following two made-for-television films were produced by Fox Television Studios and aired on the Disney-owned ABC and ABC Family. Following the acquisition of 21st Century Fox by Disney, a sixth film in the franchise was produced by the newly renamed 20th Century Studios for the Disney-owned streaming service Disney+.

A new movie is currently in development at 20th Century Studios and Point Grey Pictures with Macaulay Culkin returning as Kevin McCallister.

== Films ==
| Films | Protagonist | U.S. release date | Director(s) | Screenwriter(s) | Producer(s) |
|---|---|---|---|---|---|
| Home Alone | Kevin McCallister (Macaulay Culkin) | November 16, 1990 | Chris Columbus | John Hughes | John Hughes |
| Home Alone 2: Lost in New York | Kevin McCallister (Macaulay Culkin) | November 20, 1992 | Chris Columbus | John Hughes | John Hughes |
| Home Alone 3 | Alex Pruitt (Alex D. Linz) | December 12, 1997 | Raja Gosnell | John Hughes | John Hughes; Hilton A. Green |
| Home Alone 4 | Kevin McCallister (Mike Weinberg) | November 3, 2002 | Rod Daniel | Debra Frank; Steve L. Hayes | Mitch Engel |
| Home Alone: The Holiday Heist | Finn Baxter (Christian Martyn); Alexis Baxter (Jodelle Ferland) | November 25, 2012 | Peter Hewitt | Aaron Ginsburg; Wade McIntyre | Kim Todd |
| Home Sweet Home Alone | Max Mercer (Archie Yates) | November 12, 2021 | Dan Mazer | Mikey Day; Streeter Seidell | Hutch Parker; Dan Wilson |
In Development
| Untitled Home Alone sequel | Kevin McCallister's (Macaulay Culkin) son | —N/a | —N/a | Seth Rogen, Evan Goldberg and Macaulay Culkin | Seth Rogen and Evan Goldberg |

=== Home Alone (1990) ===
Home Alone is primarily a coming-of-age story about an eight-year-old boy named Kevin McCallister (Macaulay Culkin). He is the youngest of five children who is frequently bullied by his malicious oldest brother, Buzz (Devin Ratray), and his other siblings. After events transpire between him and his family, he wishes that he had no family when his mother is punishing him for what he feels are unjustified reasons. She warns him to be careful what he wishes for and he ignores it. He wakes up the next day to discover that he is the only one left in the house. He thinks his wish came true and that he is finally alone without his obnoxious family. In reality, he was left home by mistake. His family is en route to France for a holiday trip. While his parents realize their mistake and scramble to get back to the United States, Harry and Marv, a pair of thieves known as the "Wet Bandits", attempt to burglarize the house. Kevin makes it seem like the house is not empty and fills the house with a collection of homemade booby traps. Kevin manages to trap the bandits and they get arrested, just as his family return home. The film became the highest-grossing film of 1990, grossing $476,684,675 worldwide. The film initially received mixed reviews from critics upon release, although reception became more favorable over the years. It was widely popular with audiences. It was also nominated for two Academy Awards for Best Original Score for John Williams and Best Original Song for "Somewhere in My Memory", but lost to Dances with Wolves and Dick Tracy respectively. Macaulay Culkin's performance garnered him a Golden Globe Award nomination for Best Actor – Motion Picture Musical or Comedy, but lost to Gérard Depardieu for his performance in Green Card.

=== Home Alone 2: Lost in New York (1992) ===
Set one year after the events of the first film, Kevin McCallister loses track of his family at the airport to which he accidentally gets on a plane headed for New York City while the rest of the McCallisters fly to Florida. Now alone in one of the largest cities in the world, Kevin cons his way into a room at the Plaza Hotel and begins his usual antics, such as purchasing exorbitant amounts of sweets and junk food, or renting a limousine. When Kevin discovers that the Wet Bandits (now the Sticky Bandits) Harry and Marv are on the loose again, this time in New York, he stops them from robbing charity money from Duncan's Toy Chest on Christmas Eve by setting up booby traps in his uncle's partially renovated house.

=== Home Alone 3 (1997) ===
Home Alone 3 does not center on Kevin or any of the original cast and characters, but is instead focused on Alex Pruitt (played by Alex D. Linz), a young boy who is left home alone with chickenpox. At the same time, four international criminals are hired to steal a top-secret microchip that can act as a cloaking device for a missile. They succeed in stealing it and hide it in a remote controlled car, but due to a luggage mix-up at an airport with the Pruitts' neighbor Mrs. Hess, the car ends up in the hands of Alex who is given the car for shoveling the snow in her driveway. After realizing their mistake, the thieves begin systematically searching every house on his street. Once they realize that Alex has the chip, they invade his house. He devises elaborate traps and bamboozles the four crooks with the help of his pets and some intricate tripwires, all the while monitoring them with a video camera on the toy car. The film was nominated for a Golden Raspberry Award for Worst Remake or Sequel, eventually losing the award to Speed 2: Cruise Control.

=== Home Alone 4 (2002) ===
The fourth installment was directed by Rod Daniel and premiered as a television film on ABC on November 3, 2002. This film returns to the original's main character, Kevin (played by Mike Weinberg), and one of the Wet/Sticky Bandits, Marv (played by French Stewart). Kevin's parents have separated, and he lives with his mother. He decides to spend Christmas with his father and his father's rich girlfriend, Natalie, while they host a visiting prince at her mansion. Kevin has to deal with his old nemesis as Marv tries to kidnap the prince with the help of Vera, Marv's new wife and sidekick (played by Missi Pyle), and a seeming unlikely servant as their inside person. It was released to Region 1 DVD on October 20, 2003. Filming began on July 29 in Cape Town, South Africa. Home Alone 4 is the first film in the series that had no involvement from John Hughes and was not theatrically released.

=== Home Alone: The Holiday Heist (2012) ===
On March 15, 2012, ABC Family announced the development of the fifth installment in the Home Alone series. It premiered exclusively on ABC Family's Countdown to the 25 Days of Christmas on November 25, 2012. The film stars Christian Martyn, Jodelle Ferland, Malcolm McDowell, Debi Mazar, and Eddie Steeples. The story centers on the Baxter family's relocation from California to Maine, where Finn becomes convinced that his new house is haunted. When his parents become stranded across town, Finn sets traps to catch his new home's ghosts, but instead proves troublesome for a group of three thieves (McDowell, Mazar, and Steeples) who plot to steal a valuable painting in the basement of the house.

=== Home Sweet Home Alone (2021) ===
In August 2019, following the acquisition of 21st Century Fox by Disney, Disney CEO Bob Iger announced that a new film in the franchise, Home Sweet Home Alone, was in development, and would premiere on the company's streaming service, Disney+. By October of the same year, Dan Mazer had entered negotiations to direct the film, with a script co-written by Mikey Day and Streeter Seidell. Hutch Parker and Dan Wilson will serve as producers. The plot centered around a boy named Max, who faces off against a married couple after he allegedly steals something of theirs. Filming was reported to begin in the first quarter of 2020, with casting underway. In November, it was confirmed that the film would be shot in Montreal, Quebec, Canada, taking place from February to April. In December 2019, Archie Yates was cast as the lead, with Rob Delaney and Ellie Kemper set to play antagonists.

In March 2020, filming on all Disney projects, including Home Alone which had begun filming in Canada, were halted due to the COVID-19 pandemic and industry restrictions worldwide. In July 2020, Ally Maki, Kenan Thompson, Chris Parnell, Aisling Bea, Pete Holmes, Timothy Simons, and Mikey Day had joined the cast. By November 2020, filming on all the movies that had been postponed by the coronavirus had resumed filming, and in some cases completed principal photography.

The film stars Ellie Kemper, Rob Delaney, Archie Yates, Aisling Bea, Kenan Thompson, Tim Simons, Pete Holmes, Ally Maki, and Chris Parnell. In December 2024, during a Q&A event, original films star Macaulay Culkin confirmed that he had declined to appear in the film, stating that he would need to get a good script to reprise his role. He also joked that any potential script could not be worse than Home Sweet Home Alone.

=== Future ===
In December 2024, during a Q&A event, when original star Macaulay Culkin was asked if he would ever appear in another Home Alone sequel, he stated that he would need to get a good script, but joked that there was no way any potential script could be worse than Home Sweet Home Alone. In August 2025, the director of the first two films, Chris Columbus said that the franchise should be left alone and that a reboot would be a "mistake", saying that it cannot be recaptured. In November 2025, Culkin said that he was open to doing a sequel to Home Alone, revealing his idea of Kevin McCallister battling his own son who sets up traps for him while he is locked out of the house. In July 2026, it was reported that Disney had met with Culkin to discuss his idea for a new Home Alone sequel. In November of that year, it was announced that Seth Rogen and Evan Goldberg were producing the film under their studio Point Grey Pictures with Culkin set to reprise his role as Kevin.

== Cancelled projects ==
In July 2018, Ryan Reynolds was attached to produce Stoned Alone, an R-rated Home Alone sequel film. Augustine Frizzell was hired to serve as director, with a script written by Kevin Burrows and Matt Mider based on the story concept by Fox executive Matt Reilly. The project was to be a joint-venture production under Reynolds' Fox-based Maximum Effort Productions, with George Dewey serving as an executive producer. The premise of the proposed project was stated as "reminiscent of the hallowed comedy classic". The plot centers on a weed-growing "loser" who misses his plane for a holiday skiing trip. He decides to get high, and as the paranoia side-effects set in, he believes he hears a break-in. As he discovers thieves have broken into his home, fully stoned and fueled by the weed, he tries to "defend his castle". In August 2018, Frizzell said that the script for Stoned Alone was being tweaked in order to enhance the emotional Christmas side of the story, with the goal being to have the film feel as much like the original Home Alone films as possible; noting that as a fan of the films as well as of Chris Columbus, it was important to get the story right. She also stated that production will not begin, until everyone involved feels like they have reached that point. In November 2020, Columbus called the project "an insult to the art of cinema", calling filmmakers to show respect to the original.

== Cast and crew ==
=== Principal cast ===
List indicators

This section includes characters who will appear or have appeared in the franchise.

- An empty grey cell indicates the character was not in the film, or that the character's official presence has not yet been confirmed.
- ^{A} indicates an appearance through archival footage or audio.
- ^{V} indicates a voice-only role.
- ^{Y} indicates a younger version of the character.

| Character | Films | | | | | | Short film |
| Character | Home Alone | Home Alone 2: Lost in New York | Home Alone 3 | Home Alone 4 | Home Alone: The Holiday Heist | Home Sweet Home Alone | Home Alone Again with the Google Assistant |
==== Introduced in Home Alone ====
| Kevin McCallister | Macaulay Culkin | Macaulay Culkin | | Mike Weinberg | | | Macaulay Culkin |
| Harry Lyme | Joe Pesci | Joe Pesci | | | | | Joe Pesci^{A} |
| Marv Murchins | Daniel Stern | Daniel Stern | | French Stewart | | | Daniel Stern^{A} |
| Kate McCallister | Catherine O'Hara | Catherine O'Hara | | Clare Carey | | | |
| Peter McCallister | John Heard | John Heard | | Jason Beghe | | | |
| Buzz McCallister | Devin Ratray | Devin Ratray | | Gideon Jacobs | | Devin Ratray | |
| Megan McCallister | Hillary Wolf | Hillary Wolf | | Chelsea Russo | | | |
| Linnie McCallister | Angela Goethals | Maureen Elizabeth Shay | | | | | |
| Jeff McCallister | Michael C. Maronna | Michael C. Maronna | | | | | |
| Frank McCallister | Gerry Bamman | Gerry Bamman | | | | | |
| Leslie McCallister | Terrie Snell | Terrie Snell | | | | | |
| Fuller McCallister | Kieran Culkin | Kieran Culkin | | | | | |
| Rod McCallister | Jedidiah Cohen | Jedidiah Cohen | | | | | |
| Tracy McCallister | Senta Moses | Senta Moses | | | | | |
| Sondra McCallister | Daiana Campeanu | Daiana Campeanu | | | | | |
| Brooke McCallister | Anna Slotky | Anna Slotky | | | | | |
| Old Man Marley | Roberts Blossom | | | | | | |
| Gus Polinski | John Candy | | | | | | |
| Heather McCallister | Kristin Minter | | | | | | |
| Mitch Murphy | Jeffrey Wiseman | | | | | | |
===== Introduced in Home Alone 2: Lost in New York =====
| Mr. Hector | | Tim Curry | | | | | |
| Pigeon Lady | | Brenda Fricker | | | | | |
| Cedric | | Rob Schneider | | | | | |
| Hester Stone | | Dana Ivey | | | | | |
| Fashion Model | | Leigh Zimmerman | | | | | |
| E.F. Duncan | | Eddie Bracken | | | | | |
===== Introduced in Home Alone 3 =====
| Alex Pruitt | | | Alex D. Linz | | | | |
| Peter Beaupre | | | Aleksander Krupa | | | | |
| Earl Unger | | | David Thornton | | | | |
| Burton Jernigan | | | Lenny Von Dohlen | | | | |
| Alice Ribbons | | | Rya Kihlstedt | | | | |
| Karen Pruitt | | | Haviland Morris | | | | |
| Jack Pruitt | | | Kevin Kilner | | | | |
| Mrs. Hess | | | Marian Seldes | | | | |
| Stan Pruitt | | | Seth Smith | | | | |
| Molly Pruitt | | | Scarlett Johansson | | | | |
| FBI Agent Stuckey | | | Christopher Curry | | | | |
| Parrot | | | Darren T. Knaus^{V} | | | | |
===== Introduced in Home Alone 4 =====
| Vera Murchins | | | | Missi Pyle | | | |
| Molly Murchins | | | | Barbara Babcock | | | |
| Mr. Prescott | | | | Erick Avari | | | |
| Natalie Kalban | | | | Joanna Going | | | |
| The Crown Prince | | | | Craig Geldenhuys | | | |
===== Introduced in Home Alone: The Holiday Heist =====
| Finn Baxter | | | | | Christian Martyn | | |
| Sinclair | | | | | Malcolm McDowell | | |
| Jessica | | | | | Debi Mazar | | |
| Hughes | | | | | Eddie Steeples | | |
| Alexis Baxter | | | | | Jodelle Ferland | | |
| Catherine Baxter | | | | | Ellie Harvie | | |
| Curtis Baxter | | | | | Doug Murray | | |
| Simon Hassler | | | | | Bill Turnball | | |
| Mr. Carson | | | | | Ed Asner | | |
| Mason | | | | | Peter DaCunha | | |
===== Introduced in Home Sweet Home Alone =====
| Maxwell "Max" Mercer | | | | | | Archie Yates | |
| Jeff McKenzie | | | | | | Rob Delaney | |
| Pam McKenzie | | | | | | Ellie Kemper | |
| Carol Mercer | | | | | | Aisling Bea | |
| Hunter | | | | | | Tim Simons | |
| Mei | | | | | | Ally Maki | |
| Abby McKenzie | | | | | | Katie Beth Hall Justine Archambault^{Y} | |
| Chris McKenzie | | | | | | Max Ivutin Amadeo Correia^{Y} | |
| Ollie | | | | | | Aiden Wang Allan Wang | |
| Gavin Washington | | | | | | Kenan Thompson | |
| Stu Mercer | | | | | | Chris Parnell | |
| Blake Mercer | | | | | | Pete Holmes | |
| Mike Mercer | | | | | | Andy Daly | |
| Katie Mercer | | | | | | Maddie Holliday | |
Angels film series characters (Note: A series of in-universe films starring a man portraying a character named Johnny appears throughout the franchise. The films he performs in include Angels with Filthy Souls, Angels with Even Filithier Souls and Space Angels with the Filithiest Souls.)
| Johnny | Ralph Foody | Ralph Foody | | | | John Novak | Ralph Foody^{A} |
| Snakes | Michael Guido | | | | | Eddie G. | |
| Carlotta | | Clare Hoak | | | | | |

=== Additional crew and production details ===
| Film | Crew/Detail | | | | |
| Film | Composer | Cinematographer | Editor(s) | Production companies | Distributing companies |
|---|---|---|---|---|---|
| Home Alone | John Williams | Julio Macat | Raja Gosnell | Hughes Entertainment | 20th Century Fox |
| Home Alone 2: Lost in New York | John Williams | Julio Macat | Raja Gosnell | Hughes Entertainment | 20th Century Fox |
| Home Alone 3 | Nick Glennie-Smith | Julio Macat | Bruce Green & Malcolm Campbell | Hughes Entertainment | 20th Century Fox |
| Home Alone 4 | Teddy Castellucci | Peter Benison | John Coniglio & Michael A. Stevenson | Fox Television Studios; 20th Century Fox Television | 20th Century Fox Home Entertainment |
| Home Alone: The Holiday Heist | David Kitay | Peter Benison | John Coniglio | Original Pictures; Fox Television Studios; Manitoba Film and Video Production Tax Credit | 20th Century Fox Home Entertainment |
| Home Sweet Home Alone | John Debney | Mitchell Amundsen | David Rennie | 20th Century Studios; Hutch Parker Entertainment | Disney+ |

== Reception ==
=== Box office performance ===
| Film | Release date | Box office revenue | | | Box office ranking | | Budget | Reference |
| Film | Release date | United States | International | Worldwide | All time domestic | All time worldwide | Budget | Reference |
|---|---|---|---|---|---|---|---|---|
| Home Alone | November 16, 1990 | $285,761,243 | $190,923,432 | $476,684,675 | #38 (#36^{(A)}) | #68 | $18 million | |
| Home Alone 2: Lost in New York | November 20, 1992 | $173,585,516 | $185,409,334 | $358,994,850 | #137 (#138^{(A)}) | #151 | $28 million | |
| Home Alone 3 | December 12, 1997 | $30,882,515 | $48,200,000 | $79,082,515 | #1,807 | —N/a | $32 million | |
| Total | | $490,229,274 | $424,532,766 | $914,762,040 | | | $70 million | |
List indicators: A grey cell with N/A indicates information is Not Available.^{(A)} indicates the adjusted totals based on current ticket prices (calculated by Box Office Mojo).

=== Critical and public response ===
The first and second films received mixed reviews from critics, while the remaining films received generally negative reviews from critics.

| Film | Rotten Tomatoes | Metacritic | CinemaScore |
|---|---|---|---|
| Home Alone | 66% (116 reviews) | 63 (9 reviews) | A |
| Home Alone 2: Lost in New York | 35% (57 reviews) | 46 (22 reviews) | A- |
| Home Alone 3 | 36% (25 reviews) | —N/a | B+ |
| Home Alone 4 | N/A (2 reviews) | —N/a | —N/a |
| Home Alone: The Holiday Heist | N/A (1 review) | —N/a | —N/a |
| Home Sweet Home Alone | 15% (72 reviews) | 35 (16 reviews) | —N/a |

== Music ==
| Title | U.S. release date | Length | Composer(s) | Label |
|---|---|---|---|---|
| Home Alone: Original Motion Picture Soundtrack | December 4, 1990 | 56:58 | John Williams | CBS Masterworks |
| Home Alone 2: Lost in New York – Original Score | November 20, 1992 | 1:03:20 | John Williams | Arista Records, 20th Century Fox Film Scores |
| Home Alone 3: Music from the Motion Picture | December 12, 1997 | 40:39 | Various | Hollywood |
| Home Sweet Home Alone (Original Soundtrack) | November 12, 2021 | 46:57 | John Debney | |

== Other media ==
=== Merchandise ===
Twentieth Century Fox's licensing division predicted that $500 million worth of Home Alone II items would be sold but sales were half that amount according to industry publication The Licensing Letter.

=== Novelizations ===
Home Alone (ISBN 0-590-55066-7) was novelized by Todd Strasser and published by Scholastic in 1990 to coincide with the film. On October 6, 2015, to celebrate the 25th anniversary of the movie, an illustrated book (ISBN 1-594-74858-6) by Kim Smith and Quirk Books was released.

Home Alone 2: Lost in New York was novelized by Todd Strasser and published by Scholastic in 1992 to coincide with the film. The "point" version, which has the same storyline, was also novelized by A.L. Singer (ISBN 0-590-45717-9). An audiobook version was also released, read by Tim Curry (who played the concierge in the film).

A novelization based on the screenplay Home Alone 3 was written by Todd Strasser and published by Scholastic in 1997 to coincide with the film (ISBN 0-590-95712-0).

=== Video games ===
Home Alone was released in 1991 on the Nintendo Entertainment System, Super NES, Master System, Genesis, Game Gear, Amiga, MS-DOS, and Game Boy. The objective is to escape the Wet Bandits while bringing all the McCallister's fortunes from the house down to the safe room in the basement. Once all items have been sent down the chute to the basement Kevin must make it past rats, bats, and ghosts he encounters in the basement, then fight the spider king so he can make it to the safe room to lock away all his families riches.

Home Alone 2: Lost in New York was released on the Super NES, NES, and Game Boy in 1992, and the MS-DOS, Sega Genesis, and NES in 1993. Though it is based on the film in terms of plot and additional dialogue, the game was different from the film. The NES port uses sound effects from the early 1990s Simpsons games; Bart vs. the Space Mutants for example. The Super NES version, while boasting a soundtrack with the Super NES traditionally realistic sounding instrument synth, suffered due to slightly post-8-bit graphics and sound effects, as well as a disjointed feel of incontinuity between stages. The game got negative reception from Electronic Gaming Monthly.

Home Alone is an action game based on the first film and released in Europe only. The game was published by Blast! Entertainment Limited and released for the PlayStation 2 on December 1, 2006. The game features 10 levels, each taking place inside a house. The player chooses from one of four playable characters: Carl, Carly, Kelly or Kevin. The player's goal is to use objects to defeat burglars attempting to break into the house. The game includes a two-player option.

=== Advertising ===
In an advertisement short film titled Home Alone Again with the Google Assistant for the Google Assistant published on December 19, 2018, Macaulay Culkin reprised his Home Alone role as Kevin McCallister. The ad recreates scenes from the original 1990 film, where Kevin shaves his face, jumps on his parents bed, and decorates a Christmas tree all while asking the Google Assistant to set reminders for him. The advertisement quickly went viral. Ralph Foody, Joe Pesci, and Daniel Stern also appear in their Home Alone roles via archival footage. In addition, Joe Pesci appears present-day in a version of the commercial made for Super Bowl LIII involving his character hosting a fictionalized watch party for the Super Bowl with the commercial coming on.

Culkin again reprised the role in 2025 as part of Home Instead's Home but not Alone advertising campaign. The main commercial sees Kevin trying to protect his aging mother's house from potential accidents while meeting Old Man Marley's granddaughter. Several shorter ads feature Kevin ordering pizza and carrying groceries, recreating scenes from the film.

In 2026, Culkin reprised the role in an advertisement for a Home Alone-themed McDonalds meal.

=== Film ===
In the 2019 film Detective Pikachu, the lead character Tim Goodman (played by Justice Smith) enters his father's apartment and discovers the TV on with the movie Angels with Filthy Souls playing on it. Regarding its inclusion, director Rob Letterman stated, "Truth be told, we were just looking for the perfect placeholder ... Mark Sanger, our editor, dropped it in, and it just fit perfectly."

A Christmas special inspired by the original film titled Mickey's Home Alone will be released on Disney Jr. on November 26, 2026, and on Disney+ the following day. In it, Mickey Mouse and Pluto are accidentally left home alone when Minnie Mouse takes the gang on a Christmas trip to a world-famous Ice Palace.

== See also ==
- Bone Alone
- Bushwhacked
