= Home Alone: The Holiday Heist =

2012 film by Peter Hewitt

- DVD cover
- Genre: Christmas comedy film
- Based on: Home Alone by John Hughes
- Written by: Aaron Ginsburg; Wade McIntyre
- Directed by: Peter Hewitt
- Starring: Christian Martyn; Eddie Steeples; Jodelle Ferland; Doug Murray; Ellie Harvie; Debi Mazar; Malcolm McDowell
- Music by: David Kitay
- Country of origin: United States
- Original language: English

Production
- Producer: Kim Todd
- Cinematography: Peter Benison
- Editor: John Coniglio
- Running time: 90 minutes
- Production company: Fox Television Studios

Original release
- Network: ABC Family
- Release: November 25, 2012

Related
- Home Alone 4 (2002); Home Sweet Home Alone (2021)

Home Alone: The Holiday Heist is a 2012 American Christmas comedy film directed by Peter Hewitt. A standalone sequel to Home Alone 4 (2002), it is the fifth installment in the Home Alone franchise. It stars Christian Martyn, Jodelle Ferland, Malcolm McDowell, Debi Mazar, and Eddie Steeples. The film was produced by Fox Television Studios and premiered on ABC Family on November 25, 2012, during the network's annual Countdown to 25 Days of Christmas programming block. It is the second film after Home Alone 3 not to focus on the McCallister family.

== Plot ==
The Baxter family move from California to Rockland, Maine and settle into their new house during the Christmas season. Ten-year-old Finn Baxter and his older sister Alexis are technophiles who isolate themselves from their parents Curtis and Catherine and the outside world. Finn is often playing video games and Alexis is often on her phone and computer. Encouraged by his dad to socialize, Finn befriends his neighbor Mason who informs him about the legend of a smothered gangster whose ghost haunts the Baxters' new home, leaving Finn paranoid.

While the family leaves their home to go Christmas shopping, a group of thieves consisting of Sinclair, Jessica, and their new safecracker Hughes carry out their plan to break in and steal an old, long lost Edvard Munch painting valued at $85 million, unaware the house is occupied. They are unable to locate the painting in the basement safe. As the Baxters return home, the thieves quickly flee. At night, Curtis and Catherine leave for a Christmas party hosted by Catherine's new boss, Mr. Carson. Finn and Alexis stay behind due to their petty behavior, Finn is not permitted to play video games and Alexis can only use her phone for emergency calls.

That night, the thieves plan to return, thinking the house will be clear. Sinclair confides in Jessica and Hughes that the painting they seek is The Widow, a portrait of his great-grandmother and her family that was stolen decades ago. Meanwhile, Finn adventures in the house and finds a spare controller. Searching for new batteries, he accidentally drops one into the basement. Finn has Alexis accompany him to retrieve it and they find the safe unlocked and a secret room behind it, which houses the painting Sinclair is looking for. Frightened by the portrait, Finn flees and Alexis accidentally triggers a trap and becomes locked in the room.

As an ongoing snowstorm worsens, Curtis and Catherine are forced to stay at the Christmas party, worrying about their kids at home. With Alexis locked behind the safe, Finn goes shopping for supplies at a hardware store to break her out, only being able to afford string. After stumbling across Sinclair, he overhears the trio discuss plans to break into his house. Rushing home, Finn tells his online friend Simon about the situation. Finn sets up numerous booby traps around the house. The thieves are forced to go through the booby traps, being injured as they do so, with the glamorous Jessica getting covered in tar. Soon enough, Curtis and Catherine are able to drive home. Using Finn's gamertag and his parents' credit card details, a concerned Simon contacts them to warn about the danger their kids are in, but they suspect him and call the police on him instead.

Back at the house, Sinclair, Jessica, and Hughes capture Finn and detain him in their SUV. Sinclair and Hughes go to open the safe. Mason, however, saves Finn by throwing snowballs at the leather-clad Jessica, who is now very disheveled. She is eventually knocked out by the snowballs.

Meanwhile, Sinclair and Hughes gain entry to the safe, finding the painting and Alexis, who threatens to destroy it. Finn flees and frees Alexis while triggering the trap that locks the duo in the basement, which is seen on Simon's television by the police officers who detained him. With Mason having encased Jessica up to her neck within a headless snowman, the police arrive to arrest the intruders. The next day on Christmas Eve. The family receives four museum passes and $30,000 as a reward for capturing the fugitives and recovering the painting. As an apology for accusing him, Finn's parents send Simon a plane ticket to return home and spend Christmas with his family.

On Christmas Day, Finn receives a snowboard and an expansion pack to "Robo Infantry 3". Alexis gets a tablet computer, and Finn and his dad get a camping guide. Finn decides to take a break from video games and go snowboarding with Mason, now his best friend. The final scene shows the offenders having their mug shots taken at the police station as a female police officer splices a copy of the mug shots into a portrait.

== Cast ==
- Christian Martyn as Finn Baxter
- Jodelle Ferland as Alexis Baxter
- Malcolm McDowell as Sinclair
- Debi Mazar as Jessica
- Eddie Steeples as Hughes
- Ellie Harvie as Catherine Baxter
- Doug Murray as Curtis Baxter
- Ed Asner as Mr. Carson
- Peter DaCunha as Mason
- Adriana O'Neil as Gabby Maranta
- Bill Turnbull as Simon Hassler
- Chris Sigurdson as Clerk
- Evan Scott as Santa Claus in sleigh

== Production ==
Originally titled Home Alone: Alone in the Dark, development for the film began in March 2012 as a co-production between ABC Family and Fox Television Studios. Both companies also co-produced Home Alone 4: Taking Back the House in 2002.

The film was filmed in Winnipeg, Manitoba, Canada.

== Release ==
In November 2020, Disney began to feature the original Home Alone trilogy on their streaming platform service Disney+ in celebration of the first film's 30th anniversary. The fourth and fifth installments were released on HBO Max and were added to Disney+ on December 17, 2021.

== Reception ==
Home Alone: The Holiday Heist received mainly negative reviews, although it fared better than the previous installment in the series. Emily Ashby of Common Sense Media awarded the film 2 out of 5 stars, writing that although the film was a "predictable slapstick comedy", it "still delivers the laughs".

== Home media ==
The television film was released on DVD on October 29, 2013, in the United States and Canada. It was released in Region 4 on November 12, 2014. In Region 2, the film was released in 2013 but was initially only available on downloads and online streaming and its distribution there remains mainly focused on those formats. On November 2, 2015, the film was released on DVD in the United Kingdom as part of a box set of the first five Home Alone films exclusively on Amazon.co.uk.

The film grossed $996,000 in home video sales.

== Sequel ==
A sequel titled Home Sweet Home Alone, was released in November 2021.

== See also ==
- List of Christmas films
