= Home Alone 4 =

2002 film directed by Rod Daniel

- Promotional release poster
- Genre: Christmas; Family; Comedy
- Based on: Home Alone by John Hughes
- Written by: Debra Frank; Steve L. Hayes
- Directed by: Rod Daniel
- Starring: French Stewart; Erick Avari; Barbara Babcock; Jason Beghe; Clare Carey; Joanna Going; Missi Pyle; Mike Weinberg
- Music by: Teddy Castellucci
- Country of origin: United States
- Original language: English

Production
- Executive producers: David Madden; Lisa Demberg
- Producer: Mitch Engel
- Cinematography: Peter Benison
- Editors: Michael A. Stevenson; John Coniglio
- Running time: 84 minutes
- Production company: Fox Television Studios

Original release
- Network: ABC
- Release: November 3, 2002

Related
- Home Alone 3 (1997); Home Alone: The Holiday Heist (2012)

Home Alone 4 (also known as Home Alone: Taking Back the House) is a 2002 American Christmas comedy film directed by Rod Daniel. The made-for-television film was produced by Fox Television Studios and first aired on ABC on November 3, 2002, as the first episode of the forty-seventh season of The Wonderful World of Disney, followed by a DVD release on September 2, 2003. A loose sequel to Home Alone 2: Lost in New York (1992) and the fourth installment in the Home Alone franchise, the film stars French Stewart, Erick Avari, Barbara Babcock, Jason Beghe, Clare Carey, Joanna Going, Missi Pyle, and Mike Weinberg as Kevin McCallister. It follows Kevin spending his Christmas with his father and his new girlfriend as his old enemy Marv and his wife Vera come up with a plan to kidnap a visiting prince with help from an inside person that Kevin least suspects. The film is the first in the Home Alone franchise to not receive a theatrical release.

Home Alone 4 is the first film without any contributions from John Hughes, the creator of the Home Alone series. It also does not include any of the original cast members. Whereas Home Alone 3 featured a standalone plot and new characters, this film brings back some main characters from the first two films, including Kevin McCallister. However, all of the roles are played by different actors. It was the last film that Rod Daniel directed before his subsequent retirement, and his death in 2016.

== Plot ==
Peter McCallister, finalizing a divorce from Kate, announces to their children (Buzz, Megan, and Kevin) that he and his wealthy girlfriend, Natalie Kalban, are hosting the visit of a royal family at her mansion. Peter invites his kids to spend Christmas there. After the three initially refuse, Kevin accepts the offer after being bullied by Buzz, and revels in the mansion's luxuries.

The next morning, Peter and Natalie go out while Kevin stays with Natalie's servants, Mr. Prescott and Molly. Kevin notices his old nemesis, Marv Murchins, and his wife, Vera, scouting the house. After failing to get Mr. Prescott's attention via the intercom, he drives the intruders away by flooding the mansion. When Peter and Natalie return, they refuse to believe Kevin's explanation, especially since Mr. Prescott claims to have seen nothing. Then Kevin discovers that the security cameras had been turned off during the break-in, leading him to believe that Mr. Prescott is involved with Marv and Vera. So to cheer themselves up, Kevin, Peter, and Natalie decorate their Christmas tree, although it is later re-trimmed by professional decorators at Natalie's request.

As the mansion is prepared for a party for the royal family's arrival, Peter and Natalie leave to pick them up, while Kevin notices Marv and Vera disguised as caterers. He traps Mr. Prescott in the freezer, overhears Marv and Vera's plan to kidnap the prince and hold him for a ransom, and forces them out of a second story window. The royal family is unable to attend the party because their flight was cancelled, so Peter and Natalie decide to announce their engagement instead. Marv and Vera run back into the house to pursue Kevin, who accidentally ruins the party by running into the guests and knocking over an ice sculpture that turns out to be the frozen Mr. Prescott. Angered, Peter sends Kevin to his room, refusing to believe his story of the criminals' plot to kidnap the prince and hold him for ransom, and accusing him of trying to sabotage his relationship with Natalie, who threatens to evict him if he misbehaves again.

Taking matters into his own hands, Kevin sets up booby traps for Marv and Vera. The next morning, the duo head to the house after Peter and Natalie leave to pick up the royals. Kevin locks Mr. Prescott in the basement, but eventually discovers Marv and Vera's real accomplice is Molly, who is also Marv's mother. Kevin is locked in the basement with Mr. Prescott and Prescott says with the smart remotes Molly gave the offenders they had shut off the cameras during the break-in when he was taking an unscheduled break from his duties because he despises working for Natalie; he and Kevin then apologize for misjudging each other. After several failed attempts to call Kate back, Kevin escapes via the house's dumbwaiter and temporarily traps Marv underneath it. Marv and Vera pursue Kevin throughout the house, where they spring the traps and suffer various injuries, while Molly is trapped in the house's elevator.

At the airport, Peter suspects that something is wrong back at the house. He takes a cab back to Natalie's to check on Kevin due to a suspicious phone call received from Kate regarding Kevin's whereabouts. Meanwhile Kate, Buzz and Megan also drive to the mansion due to the suspicious nature of the calls made by both Peter and Molly about Kevin's whereabouts. Kevin uses an altered recording of Marv's voice to spark an argument between him and Vera. Then Kevin hits Marv in the groin with a remote-controlled plane causing Marv to fall down a flight of stairs taking Vera along with him. The duo is then tricked by Kevin with a secret wall switch, ends up being launched onto a chandelier, and are knocked unconscious by their fall. Molly, having escaped the elevator, grabs Kevin, but is quickly knocked out cold by Mr. Prescott who also escaped via the dumbwaiter shaft and calls the police.

As Peter, Kate, Buzz, and Megan arrive, Kevin, with Buzz and Megan's help, prevents a final escape attempt from Marv and Vera. The royal family and Natalie arrive, and the offenders' plot to kidnap the prince is revealed to Natalie's shock. Mr. Prescott, per Kevin's advice, resigns from his position as her butler. Realizing that their relationship was built on infatuation rather than love and was affecting his responsibilities as a husband and father, Peter breaks up with Natalie, and reconciles with Kate and their children. Grateful to Kevin for his foiling of the kidnapping plot, the royals spend Christmas with the newly reunited McCallisters, devastating Natalie.

== Cast ==
- Mike Weinberg as Kevin McCallister
- French Stewart as Marv Merchants
- Erick Avari as Prescott
- Barbara Babcock as Molly
- Jason Beghe as Peter McCallister
- Clare Carey as Kate McCallister
- Joanna Going as Natalie
- Missi Pyle as Vera Merchants
- Gideon Jacobs as Buzz McCallister
- Chelsea Russo as Megan McCallister

== Production ==
Home Alone 4 was filmed in Cape Town, South Africa.

== Release ==
=== Home media ===
Home Alone 4 premiered on ABC on November 3, 2002, as the first episode of the forty-seventh season of The Wonderful World of Disney. It was later released on DVD by 20th Century Fox Home Entertainment on September 2, 2003.

=== Streaming ===
In November 2020, Disney began to feature the first three Home Alone films on their streaming service Disney+ in celebration of the first film's 30th anniversary. The fourth and fifth installments were released on HBO Max and were added to Disney+ on December 17, 2021.

== Reception ==
Home Alone 4 received generally negative reviews. Clint Morris at Moviehole gave Home Alone 4 one out of five stars, writing, "From the unappealing cheapish opening titles to the murky production values, it's immediately obvious Home Alone 4 isn't playing in the same park as its beloved predecessor... sad". Joly Herman of Common Sense Media also rated the film one out of five stars and wrote, "recycled gags with none of the original's charm". Jerry Roberts of Armchair Media gave the film one out of four stars. Sue Robinson of Radio Times gave the film one out of five stars, writing that, "you have to wonder why they bothered".

== Sequel ==
Home Alone: The Holiday Heist premiered on that network during the 2012 Christmas season. The film stars Christian Martyn as the 10-year-old main character Finn Baxter. The story centers on the family's relocation from California to Maine, where Finn becomes convinced that his new house is haunted. When his parents become stranded across town and Finn is left home alone with his older sister Alexis, he sets traps to catch his new home's ghosts, which instead prove troublesome for a group of thieves (played by Malcolm McDowell, Debi Mazar, and Eddie Steeples). The film also starred Ed Asner, produced by Fox Television Studios, and directed by Peter Hewitt.

== See also ==
- List of Christmas films
- List of television films produced for American Broadcasting Company
