= Home Alone 2: Lost in New York (video game) =

1992 video game

- NES box art
- Developers: Imagineering (NES, GB); Sega Interactive Development (Genesis); Manley & Associates (MS-DOS)
- Publishers: THQ; Sega of America; Capstone Software
- Producer: Alex DeMeo (SNES)
- Designers: Alex DeMeo; W. Marshall Rogers
- Programmers: NES; Christopher Will; Joseph A. Moses; SNES; Henry C. Will IV; Jason Benham; Game Boy; Roger W. Amidon
- Artists: Ray Bradley (NES/SNES); Jesse Kapili (SNES); Ross Harris (SNES); Amy Bond (GB)
- Composers: Mark Van Hecke (GB/NES/SNES); Paul Gadbois, David Delia (Genesis)
- Platforms: Super NES, NES, Genesis, Game Boy, MS-DOS
- Release: October 1992: NES; NA: October 1992; EU: 1992 Super NES; NA: October 1992; PAL: January 1, 1993 Game Boy; NA: October 1992 Genesis; NA: December 1993 MS-DOS; NA: 1993
- Genre: Action
- Mode: Single-player

Home Alone 2: Lost in New York is an action video game based loosely on the 1992 film of the same name. It was published in 1992 for the Nintendo Entertainment System and Game Boy, then in 1993 for the Genesis, Super NES and MS-DOS. The game is dedicated to Tom D. Heidt, a programmer who died shortly before it was released.

== Gameplay ==
The player controls Kevin McCallister as he makes his way alone through New York City. Locations include the Plaza Hotel, Central Park, Uncle Rob McCallister's townhouse, and the streets of New York. Kevin fights enemies using a Slide, Flying Fist and Super Flying Fist moves; for weapons, he uses a Dart gun. Using a Necklace will cause walking enemies to slip off the screen (referencing a scene where Kevin uses the pearls from a necklace to trip up his pursuers). Powerups include Pizza Slices, Whole Pies, Cookies, Bells, Candy Canes and After Shave.

== Release ==
The game was unveiled in October 1992.

The game was released in late 1992 for the NES and Game Boy. Versions for the Super NES, Genesis, and MS-DOS followed in 1993.

== Reception ==
Reception

Review score
Publication	Score
AllGame	2.5/5(GEN); 3/5(PC); 2.5/5(SNES); 2.5/5(GB); 1/5(NES)

Home Alone 2: Lost in New York was awarded Worst Sequel of 1992 by Electronic Gaming Monthly. They also awarded it Worst Movie-to-Game of 1996.

== Legacy ==
In June 2016, video game developer Frank Cifaldi found the NES version's source code on an old hard drive and released it to the public. He has stated the game's code was based on The Simpsons-licensed titles on the NES, also by Imagineering.

A sequel for the Game Boy version, entitled Home Alone 2: Lost In New York: Kevin's Dream, was slated for release in 1994, as made by Unexpected Development, but it was cancelled before it came out. Unexpected Development would re-work the title to be based on the Fox Kids animated series Bobby's World, complete with Super Game Boy functionality, but a planned 1995 release by Hi Tech Entertainment also did not occur. The ROMs for both versions of the game were leaked online in September 2020.

== See also ==
- Home Alone, a video game based on the earlier movie
