= Home Alone 2: Lost in New York =

1992 film by Chris Columbus

- Theatrical release poster
- Directed by: Chris Columbus
- Written by: John Hughes
- Based on: Characters by John Hughes
- Produced by: John Hughes
- Starring: Macaulay Culkin; Joe Pesci; Daniel Stern; John Heard; Tim Curry; Brenda Fricker; Catherine O'Hara
- Cinematography: Julio Macat
- Edited by: Raja Gosnell
- Music by: John Williams
- Production companies: 20th Century Fox; Hughes Entertainment
- Distributed by: 20th Century Fox
- Release date: November 20, 1992
- Running time: 120 minutes
- Country: United States
- Language: English
- Budget: $28 million
- Box office: $359 million

Home Alone 2: Lost in New York is a 1992 American Christmas comedy film directed by Chris Columbus and written and produced by John Hughes. The sequel to Home Alone (1990) and the second installment in the Home Alone franchise, the film stars Macaulay Culkin, Joe Pesci, Daniel Stern, John Heard, Tim Curry, Brenda Fricker and Catherine O'Hara. The story follows Kevin McCallister as he is separated from his family on their flight to Miami, Florida and ends up in New York City. While initially enjoying his newfound experiences, Kevin soon encounters the Wet Bandits again after their escape from prison.

Hughes finished writing the film by February 1991, after signing a six-picture deal with 20th Century Fox. Culkin's return was confirmed in May and the rest of the cast was finalized soon after. Principal photography took place between December 1991 and May 1992 on location in Illinois and New York, including at Rockefeller Center and the original World Trade Center.

Home Alone 2 was theatrically released in the United States by 20th Century Fox on November 20, 1992 to mixed reviews from critics. It grossed over $359 million worldwide, and became the third-highest-grossing film of 1992. Home Alone 2 is the only Home Alone sequel to feature the majority of the cast from the first film. Home Alone 3 (1997) featured a new cast and characters, and the television film Home Alone 4 (2002) recast returning characters from the first two films to new actors. A 7th film is in development, with Culkin set to reprise his role.

== Plot ==
In Chicago, the McCallister family prepares to spend Christmas in Miami, Florida. Kate and Peter's 10-year-old son Kevin is unhappy, believing the tropical climate of Miami lacks the traditional Christmas atmosphere. During a school Christmas pageant, Kevin's oldest brother Buzz humiliates him in front of the audience. Kevin retaliates by shoving Buzz, inadvertently knocking over the entire choir and ruining the event. Back home, Kevin refuses to apologize and berates his family for accepting Buzz's insincere apology and for vacationing in Miami. He storms off to the attic, wishing he could spend the holiday alone.

During the night, Peter accidentally resets his alarm clock, causing the family to oversleep. In the ensuing chaotic rush through the airport, Kevin mistakenly boards a flight to New York City while carrying Peter's bag, which contains his wallet. Initially shocked upon arrival, Kevin soon realizes he has the freedom to celebrate Christmas on his own terms. He tricks a desk clerk at the Plaza Hotel into giving him a room using Peter's credit card and explores the city. During a walk in Central Park, he is frightened by a homeless woman surrounded by pigeons. Meanwhile, the McCallisters realize Kevin is missing and alert the police after arriving in Miami.

On Christmas Eve, Kevin visits a toy store and meets its philanthropic owner, Mr. Duncan. He learns that the store's Christmas proceeds will be donated to a children's hospital. Mr. Duncan gifts Kevin a pair of ceramic turtledoves, symbolizing eternal friendship, and encourages him to give one to someone special. Outside the store, Kevin encounters Harry and Marv—criminals he thwarted the previous Christmas (Note: As depicted in Home Alone (1990))—who have recently escaped from prison. They threaten Kevin, who flees back to the Plaza. When hotel staff confronts him about Peter's credit card, which has been reported stolen, Kevin escapes. He is recaptured by Harry and Marv, who reveal their plan to rob the toy store, but Kevin manages to slip away.

The McCallisters travel to New York and stay at the Plaza while Kate searches the city for Kevin. Kevin takes refuge in his uncle's vacant townhouse, which is under renovation. In Central Park, he befriends the pigeon lady, who explains that her life fell apart after being betrayed by someone she loved. Kevin encourages her to trust others again and takes her advice to perform a good deed by foiling Harry and Marv's planned robbery.

After rigging the townhouse with a series of booby traps, Kevin interrupts the robbery by throwing a brick through the toy store's window, triggering the alarm. He lures Harry and Marv to the townhouse, where they are repeatedly injured by the traps. Kevin calls the police and leads Harry and Marv to Central Park, but slips on ice and is captured. As they prepare to shoot him, the pigeon lady intervenes, pelting the pair with birdseed that causes a massive flock of pigeons to attack them, before the police arrive to arrest them. Mr. Duncan later finds Kevin's apology note attached to the brick, explaining his actions.

Remembering Kevin's love of Christmas trees, Kate goes to the Christmas tree in Rockefeller Center, where she reunites with him. They apologize to each other and reconcile. On Christmas morning, a truckload of gifts from a grateful Mr. Duncan is delivered to the McCallisters' hotel room. After celebrating with his family, Kevin visits the pigeon lady in Central Park and gives her one of the turtledoves as a token of friendship. Back at the hotel, Peter and Buzz discover that Kevin spent $967 on room service.

== Cast ==
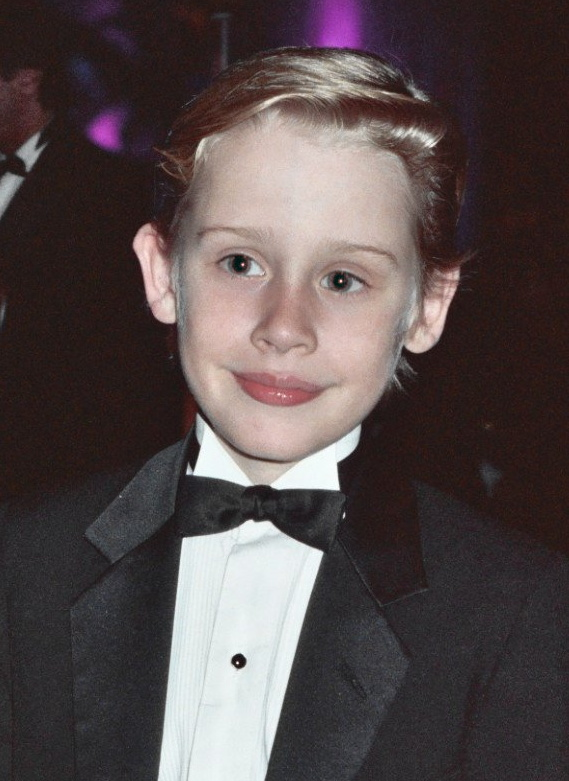
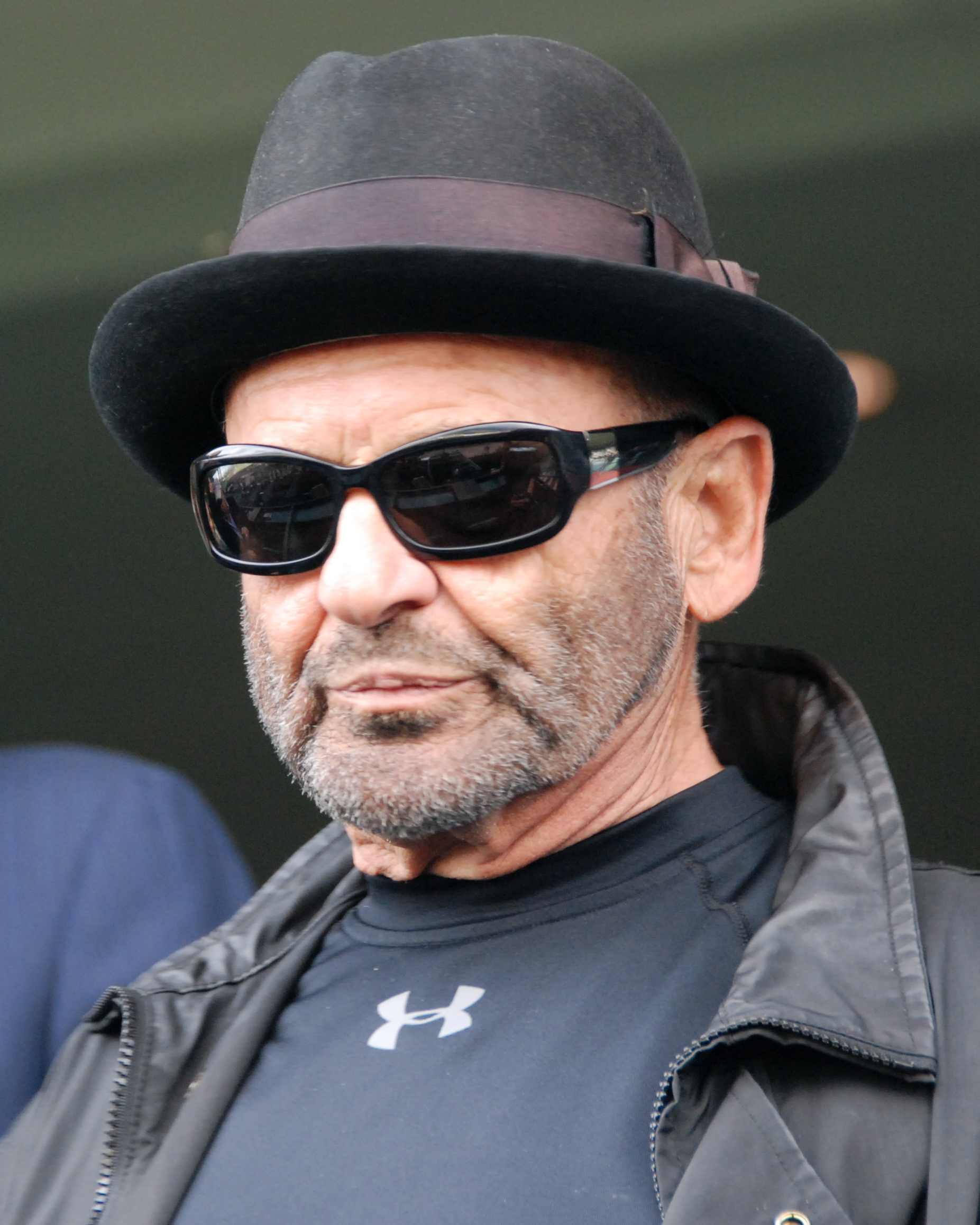
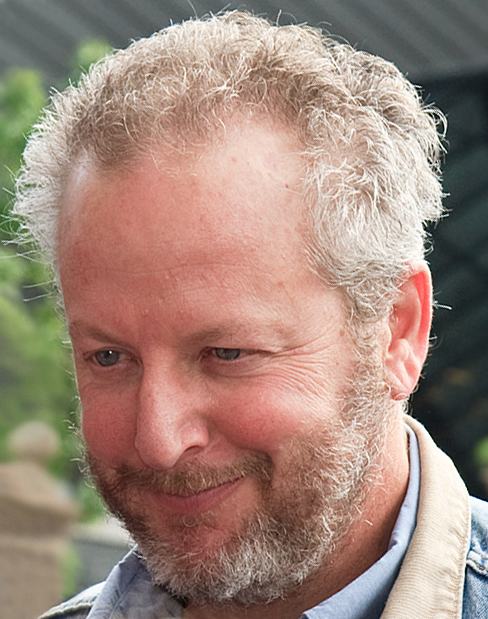
Macaulay Culkin (pictured in 1991), Joe Pesci, and Daniel Stern (both 2009)
- Macaulay Culkin as Kevin, a 10-year-old boy
- Joe Pesci as Harry, a thief and one of the Sticky Bandits duo
- Daniel Stern as Marv, a thief and the other half of the Sticky Bandits
- John Heard as Peter, Kevin's father
- Catherine O'Hara as Kate, Kevin's mother
- Eddie Bracken as Mr. Duncan, the proprietor of Duncan's Toy Chest
- Devin Ratray as Buzz, Kevin's malicious oldest brother who bullies him
- Kieran Culkin as Fuller, Kevin's youngest cousin and the son of Frank and Leslie
- Gerry Bamman as Uncle Frank, Kevin's uncle and Peter's older brother
- Rob Schneider as Cedric, the bellhop at the Plaza Hotel
- Dana Ivey as Hester Stone, the desk clerk at the Plaza Hotel
- Hillary Wolf as Megan, Kevin's oldest sister
- Tim Curry as Mr. Hector, the concierge at the Plaza Hotel
- Brenda Fricker as Pigeon Lady, a homeless woman in Central Park

The McCallister cast also includes: Maureen Elisabeth Shay as Linnie, Kevin's older sister; Michael C. Maronna as Jeff, Kevin's older brother; Terrie Snell as Aunt Leslie, Kevin's aunt; Jedidiah Cohen as Rod, Kevin's older cousin and the older son of Rob and Georgette; Senta Moses as Tracy, Kevin's older cousin and the oldest daughter of Frank and Leslie; Daiana Campeanu as Sondra, Kevin's older cousin and the middle daughter of Frank and Leslie; and Anna Slotky as Brooke, Kevin's younger cousin and the youngest daughter of Frank and Leslie.

Other cast includes Ralph Foody as Johnny (credited as "Gangster"), a gangster from the fictional film Angels with Even Filthier Souls (the sequel to Angels with Filthy Souls from the first film); Clare Hoak as Gangster – "Dame", Johnny's girlfriend from the fictional film Angels with Even Filthier Souls; and Donald Trump as himself, the then owner of the Plaza Hotel who directs Kevin to the lobby, Leigh Zimmerman is the blonde at the street corner who punches Harry and Marv.

== Production ==
In February 1991, the Los Angeles Times reported that John Hughes was to sign a six-picture deal with 20th Century Fox; among the projects was a sequel to Home Alone. In May 1991, Macaulay Culkin was paid $4.5 million plus 5 percent of the film's gross to appear in the sequel, compared to $110,000 for the original. The production budget was $28 million.

Principal photography took place from December 9, 1991, to May 1, 1992, over the course of 144 days; the film was shot in Winnetka, Illinois; O'Hare International Airport in Chicago; Evanston, Illinois; Chicago; and New York City. According to director Chris Columbus, Donald Trump, the owner of the Plaza Hotel at the time, allowed the crew to shoot scenes in the hotel lobby and one of its suites in exchange for a cameo appearance in the film in addition to the standard fee for film productions. Joe Pesci suffered burns to his head while filming the scene in which Harry's hat is set on fire.

== Music ==
John Williams returned to score Home Alone 2, as well as other festive tracks. While the film featured the first film's theme song "Somewhere in My Memory", it also contained its own theme entitled "Christmas Star" (lyrics by Leslie Bricusse). Two soundtrack albums of the film were released on November 20, 1992, with one featuring Williams's score and the other featuring pop music featured in the film. Ten years later, a 2-disc Deluxe Edition of the film score soundtrack was released by Varèse Sarabande.

=== Score ===
Original Score

Home Alone 2: Lost in New York – Original Score

Film score by John Williams
- Released: November 20, 1992
- Genre: Film Score Musical
- Length: 63:20
- Labels: Arista Records, Fox Records

John Williams chronology
Far and Away (1992)	Home Alone 2: Lost in New York – Original Score (1992)	Jurassic Park (1993)

Home Alone chronology
Home Alone (1990)	Home Alone 2 (1992)	Home Alone 3 (1997)

Home Alone 2: Lost in New York – Original Score is a 1992 soundtrack composed and conducted by John Williams, who also scored the first installment in the franchise, and performed by the Hollywood Studio Symphony. While the soundtrack is mostly a repeat of the first film's material, there are a few new prominent themes such as "Christmas Star" and "Plaza Hotel and Duncan's Toy Store". Ultimately, the soundtrack fell out of print.

No.	Title	Length
1.	"Somewhere in My Memory"	3:49
2.	"Home Alone"	2:01
3.	"We Overslept Again"	2:46
4.	"Christmas Star"	3:18
5.	"Arrival in New York"	1:41
6.	"Plaza Hotel and Duncan's Toy Store"	3:45
7.	"Concierge and Race to the Room"	2:04
8.	"Star of Bethlehem"	3:28
9.	"The Thieves Return"	4:35
10.	"Appearance of Pigeon Lady"	3:19
11.	"Christmas at Carnegie Hall ("O Come All Ye Faithful" / "O Little Town of Bethlehem" / "Silent Night")"	5:02
12.	"Into the Park"	3:49
13.	"Haunted Brownstone"	3:01
14.	"Christmas Star and Preparing the Trap"	4:17
15.	"To the Plaza Presto"	3:22
16.	"Reunion at Rockefeller Center"	2:36
17.	"Kevin's Booby Traps"	3:41
18.	"Finale"	3:55
19.	"Merry Christmas, Merry Christmas"	2:51
Total length:		63:20

=== Soundtrack ===
Original Soundtrack Album

Home Alone 2: Lost in New York – Original Soundtrack Album / Home Alone Christmas

Soundtrack album by Various artists
- Released: November 20, 1992 (Original); July 27, 1993 (HAC)
- Genres: Pop, R&B, Christmas, rock
- Length: 39:26
- Label: Fox Records

Professional ratings
Review scores
Source	Rating
AllMusic	2.5/5 stars

Home Alone 2: Lost in New York – Original Soundtrack Album is a 1992 soundtrack album that contains music from or inspired by Home Alone and Home Alone 2: Lost in New York. The album eventually was discontinued and later re-released as Home Alone Christmas in 1993 with an alternative track listing. Both versions feature tracks of John Williams's score, though the tracks are of different songs between the original album and its re-release.

Original Soundtrack Album track listing

No.	Title	Writer(s)	Performer(s)	Length
1.	"All Alone on Christmas"	Steve Van Zandt	Darlene Love	4:14
2.	"A Holly Jolly Christmas"	Johnny Marks	Alan Jackson	2:14
3.	"Somewhere in My Memory"	Leslie Bricusse; John Williams	Bette Midler	3:58
4.	"My Christmas Tree"	Alan Menken; Jack Feldman	Home Alone Children's Choir	2:35
5.	"Sleigh Ride"	Leroy Anderson; Mitchell Parish	TLC	3:44
6.	"Silver Bells"	Jay Livingston; Ray Evans	Atlantic Starr	4:15
7.	"Merry Christmas, Merry Christmas"	Leslie Bricusse; John Williams		2:40
8.	"Jingle Bell Rock"	Joe Beal; Jim Boothe	Bobby Helms	2:09
9.	"Cool Jerk (Christmas Mix)"	Donald Storball	The Capitols	2:39
10.	"It's Beginning to Look a Lot Like Christmas"	Meredith Willson	Johnny Mathis	2:14
11.	"Christmas Star"	John Williams		3:16
12.	"O Come All Ye Faithful"	Frederick Oakeley; John Francis Wade	Lisa Fischer	3:26
Total length:				39:26

Home Alone Christmas track listing

No.	Title	Writer(s)	Performer(s)	Length
1.	"All Alone on Christmas"		Darlene Love	4:16
2.	"A Holly Jolly Christmas"		Alan Jackson	2:15
3.	"My Christmas Tree"		The Fox Albert Choir	2:36
4.	"Somewhere in My Memory"		John Williams	3:50
5.	"Silver Bells"		Atlantic Starr	4:15
6.	"Sleigh Ride"		TLC	3:45
7.	"Christmas All Over Again"	Tom Petty	Tom Petty and the Heartbreakers	4:15
8.	"Please Come Home for Christmas"	Charles Brown; Gene Redd	Southside Johnny Lyon	2:42
9.	"Merry Christmas, Merry Christmas"			2:41
10.	"Carol of the Bells"	Mykola Leontovych	John Williams	1:26
11.	"Have Yourself a Merry Little Christmas"	Hugh Martin; Ralph Blane	Mel Torme	3:06
12.	"O Come All Ye Faithful"		Lisa Fischer	3:26
Total length:				38:22

The Deluxe Edition

Home Alone 2: Lost in New York – The Deluxe Edition

Soundtrack album by John Williams
- Released: November 15, 2002
- Genre: Classical
- Length: 1:39:49
- Label: Varèse Sarabande

On the film's tenth anniversary, Varèse Sarabande released a two-disc special edition soundtrack entitled Home Alone 2: Lost in New York – The Deluxe Edition. The soundtrack contains John Williams's cues found on the previous releases as well as additional compositions that were left out from the final film. This release is also known for resolving a mastering error that caused the music to be inaccurately pitched.

All lyrics are written by Leslie Bricusse.

Disc 1
No.	Title	Length
1.	"Home Alone (Main Title)"	2:07
2.	"This Year's Wish"	1:47
3.	"We Overslept Again / Holiday Flight"	3:19
4.	"Separate Vacations"	1:58
5.	"Arrival in New York"	2:59
6.	"The Thieves Return"	3:28
7.	"Plaza Hotel"	3:04
8.	"Concierge"	1:31
9.	"Distant Goodnights (Christmas Star)"	2:05
10.	"A Day in the City"	0:59
11.	"Duncan's Toy Store"	2:41
12.	"Turtle Doves"	1:29
13.	"To the Plaza, Presto"	3:27
14.	"Race to the Room / Hot Pursuit"	4:08
15.	"Haunted Brownstone"	3:02
16.	"Appearance of the Pigeon Lady"	3:21
17.	"Christmas at Carnegie Hall"	5:15

All lyrics are written by Leslie Bricusse.

Disc 2
No.	Title	Length
1.	"Christmas Star – Preparing the Trap"	4:22
2.	"Another Christmas in the Trenches"	2:33
3.	"Running Through Town"	1:16
4.	"Luring the Thieves"	4:02
5.	"Kevin's Booby Traps"	7:23
6.	"Down the Rope / Into the Park"	5:06
7.	"Reunion at Rockefeller Center / It's Christmas"	5:21
8.	"Finale"	2:00
9.	"We Wish You a Merry Christmas (Traditional) and Merry Christmas, Merry Christmas"	2:51
10.	"End Title"	1:32
11.	"Holiday Flight (Alternate)"	2:32
12.	"Suite from "Angels with Filthy Souls II""	0:56
13.	"Somewhere in My Memory"	3:57
14.	"Star of Bethlehem"	3:32
15.	"Christmas Star"	3:23
16.	"Merry Christmas, Merry Christmas"	2:23

== Release ==
=== Marketing ===
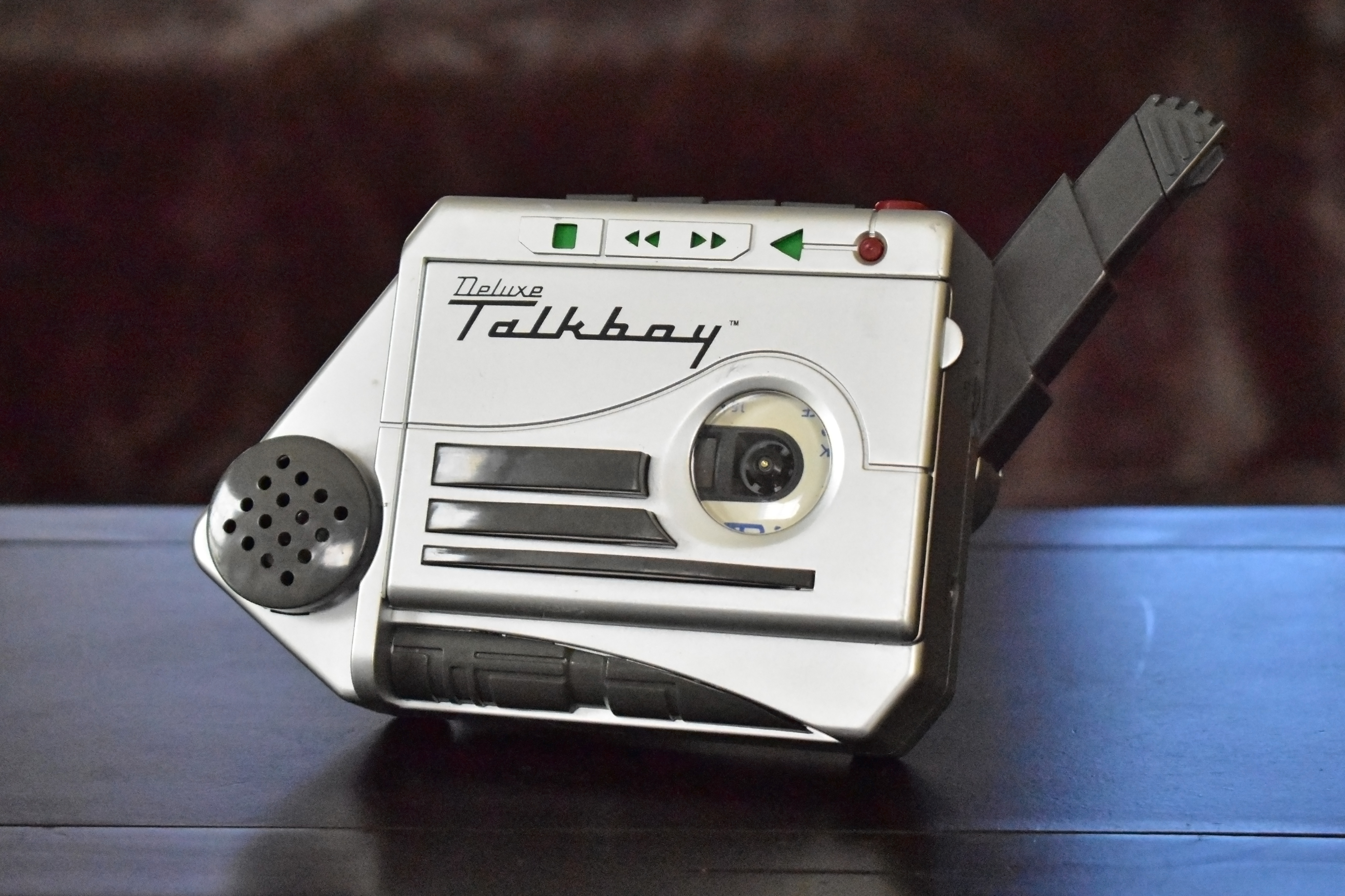
The Talkboy, originally designed as a prop for the film by Tiger Electronics, was a best-selling toy once released to market.

Numerous video games based on Home Alone 2 were released by THQ for such systems as the Sega Genesis, the Nintendo Entertainment System, the Super Nintendo Entertainment System, Game Boy and personal computers, mostly in late 1992. A separate hand-held game was released by Tiger Electronics. Numerous board games were also released, some based around play cards, while another was a close emulation of the classic Mouse Trap.

The Talkboy cassette recorder was produced as a tie-in for the movie by Tiger Electronics based on specifications provided by John Hughes and the movie studio, and sold particularly well after the film was released on home video. Additional promotional partners included American Airlines through which the McCallisters make their trip via the airline's two Boeing 767s, the Coca-Cola Company, Jack in the Box, Hardee's, and Roy Rogers Restaurants.

=== Home media ===
The film was first released by Fox Video on VHS and LaserDisc on July 27, 1993. It was successful in the home video market, and became the eighth-best-selling video of 1993 in the United States. It was later released on DVD on October 5, 1999, as a basic package. The film was released on Blu-ray on October 6, 2009, with no special features, and was released alongside Home Alone in a collection pack on October 5, 2010. The film was reissued again on DVD and Blu-ray on October 6, 2015, alongside all five Home Alone franchise films, titled Home Alone: 25th Anniversary Ultimate Collector's Christmas Edition.

== Reception ==
=== Box office ===
Home Alone 2 opened with $31.1 million from 2,222 theaters, averaging $14,009 per site. It broke the short-lived record set one week earlier by Bram Stoker's Dracula for having the largest November opening weekend. The film went on to hold this record until 1994 when it was taken by Interview with the Vampire. Additionally, it achieved the highest opening weekend for a Chris Columbus film and would hold that record until it was surpassed by Harry Potter and the Sorcerer's Stone in 2001. It started off better than Home Alone, grossing $100 million in 24 days compared to 33 days for the original. However, the final box office gross was lower with $173.6 million in the United States and Canada and a worldwide total of $359 million, compared to $476 million for the first film. The film was released in the United Kingdom on December 11, 1992, and topped the country's box office that weekend. The film is the third-highest-grossing film released in 1992 behind The Bodyguard and Aladdin. In the United States and Canada, it grossed more than The Bodyguard and ranked second.

=== Critical response ===
On Rotten Tomatoes Home Alone 2: Lost in New York has an approval rating of 35% based on 57 reviews, with an average rating of 4.5/10. The site's critical consensus reads: "A change of venue – and more sentimentality and violence – can't obscure the fact that Home Alone 2: Lost in New York is a less inspired facsimile of its predecessor." On Metacritic, the film has a weighted average score of 46 out of 100 based on 22 critics, indicating "mixed or average" reviews. Audiences polled by CinemaScore gave the film an average grade of "A−" on an A+ to F scale, a grade lower than the "A" earned by its predecessor.

Roger Ebert of the Chicago Sun-Times gave the film two out of four stars and stated that "cartoon violence is only funny in cartoons. Most of the live-action attempts to duplicate animation have failed, because when flesh-and-blood figures hit the pavement, we can almost hear the bones crunch, and it isn't funny." Kenneth Turan, reviewing for the Los Angeles Times, wrote: "Whatever was unforced and funny in the first film has become exaggerated here, whatever was slightly sentimental has been laid on with a trowel. The result, with some exceptions, plays like an over-elaborate parody of the first film, reminding us why we enjoyed it without being able to duplicate its appeal." Dave Kehr of the Chicago Tribune wrote the sequel "plays like a coarsened, self-parodying version of the original, in which the fantasy elements have become grubbier and more materialistic, the sentimentality more treacly and aggressive, and the slapstick violence—already astonishingly intense in the first film—even more graphic and sadistic." Brian Lowry of Variety noted the sequel's derivativeness when compared to the original film, but wrote the "action sequences are well-choreographed, if, perhaps, too mean-spirited even in light of their cartoonish nature".

Janet Maslin for The New York Times acknowledged that "Home Alone 2 may be lazily conceived, but it is staged with a sense of occasion and a lot of holiday cheer. The return of Mr. Culkin in this role is irresistible, even if this utterly natural comic actor has been given little new to do. Mr. Pesci and Mr. Stern bring great gusto to their characters' stupidity, to the point where they are far funnier just walking and talking than they are being hurt." Reviewing for Time magazine, Richard Schickel noted "Home Alone 2 precisely follows the formula that made its predecessor the biggest grossing comedy in human history. But no, it is not a drag, and it is not a rip-off. Look on it as a twice-told fairy tale." He praised Hughes and Chris Columbus and felt "the details of the situations are developed vividly and originally. And they are presented with an energy and a conviction that sequels usually lack." Duane Byrge of The Hollywood Reporter wrote that while the "sequel is merely a superimposition of the original, kids will be delighted" by it. He further praised Culkin as "breezily winning", felt Pesci and Stern deserved combat medals, and Curry served as "a terrific foil for Kevin's pranks".

Culkin explained that he preferred the sequel more than the first film, "I got paid more. I think I own five percent of the net. And also 15 percent of the merchandising. So, if you buy a Talkboy I'm like yeah, I'll take 15 percent of that. Thank you very much."

=== Retrospective response ===
During the 21st century, online reviewers have looked more favorably on the film. John Nugent of Empire, in a 2022 article entitled 'Why Home Alone 2: Lost In New York Is Better Than Home Alone', argued that the film was "a sequel that effectively also functions as a remake, a film that recognises the greatness of what came before and wisely hews as close to that winning formula as possible." Nugent also opined that "by setting the final showdown in a house undergoing renovations, the filmmakers give themselves room to be more ambitious, wild, and far more brutal" and praised the work of stunt coordinator Freddie Hice since no CGI was used. Also writing in 2022, Reid Goldberg of Collider noted: "A significant part of the film's appeal... is that it's unapologetic in taking everything they loved about the first film to a higher level."

== Novelization ==
A novelization of Home Alone 2 was written by Todd Strasser and published by Scholastic in 1992 to coincide with the film. The "point" version, which has the same storyline, was also novelized by A.L. Singer. An audiobook version was also released read by Tim Curry (who played the concierge in the film).

== Sequels ==
A third film with a new cast, Home Alone 3, followed in 1997. Two television movies, Home Alone 4, which features returning characters but with a different cast, and Home Alone: The Holiday Heist, aired in 2002 and 2012, respectively. Home Sweet Home Alone, the sixth film in the series which has Devin Ratray reprise his role as Buzz, was released on the streaming service Disney+ in 2021.

== See also ==
- List of Christmas films
- List of films featuring fictional films
