= Home Alone =

1990 film directed by Chris Columbus

- Theatrical release poster
- Directed by: Chris Columbus
- Written by: John Hughes
- Produced by: John Hughes
- Starring: Macaulay Culkin; Joe Pesci; Daniel Stern; John Heard; Catherine O'Hara
- Cinematography: Julio Macat
- Edited by: Raja Gosnell
- Music by: John Williams
- Production companies: 20th Century Fox; Hughes Entertainment
- Distributed by: 20th Century Fox
- Release dates: November 10, 1990 (sneak preview); November 16, 1990 (United States)
- Running time: 103 minutes
- Country: United States
- Language: English
- Budget: $18 million
- Box office: $476.7 million

Home Alone is a 1990 American Christmas comedy film directed by Chris Columbus and written and produced by John Hughes. The first film in the Home Alone franchise, the film stars Macaulay Culkin as Kevin McCallister, an eight-year-old boy who defends his suburban Chicago home from a home invasion by a pair of robbers after his family accidentally leaves him behind on their Christmas vacation to Paris. The cast also features Joe Pesci, Daniel Stern, John Heard, and Catherine O'Hara.

Hughes conceived Home Alone while on vacation, with Warner Bros. being originally intended to finance and distribute the film. Warner Bros. shut down the production after it exceeded its assigned budget, but it quickly resumed under 20th Century Fox following meetings with Hughes; Columbus and Culkin were hired soon afterwards. Filming took place between February and May 1990 on location across Illinois.

Home Alone had a sneak preview across 1,000 theaters on November 10, 1990, and was theatrically released in the United States on November 16. It received mixed-to-positive reviews and grossed $476.7 million worldwide, becoming the second-highest-grossing film of 1990. It made Culkin a child star and was the highest-grossing live-action comedy for two decades. It was nominated for two Academy Awards and two Golden Globe Awards. Home Alone has since been considered one of the best Christmas films. In 2023, Home Alone was selected for preservation in the National Film Registry by the Library of Congress as "culturally, historically, or aesthetically significant". Five sequels have been released: Home Alone 2: Lost in New York (1992), Home Alone 3 (1997), Home Alone 4: Taking Back the House (2002), Home Alone: The Holiday Heist (2012), and Home Sweet Home Alone (2021). A 7th film is in development, with Culkin set to reprise his role.

== Plot ==
The McCallister family is preparing to spend Christmas in Paris, gathering at Peter and Kate's home in a Chicago suburb the night before their departure. Their youngest son, Kevin, is the subject of ridicule by his older siblings because of his immaturity. During a scuffle with his oldest brother Buzz, Kevin accidentally ruins the family dinner; while cleaning up the mess, Peter inadvertently throws away Kevin's flight ticket. As punishment, Kate sends Kevin to the attic, where he angrily berates his mother and wishes his family would disappear. During the night, heavy winds cause a power outage that resets the alarm clocks and leads the family to oversleep. The next morning, in the chaotic rush to leave for the airport, Kevin is accidentally left behind.

Kevin wakes to find the house empty and, thinking that his wish has come true, initially enjoys his newfound freedom. He ransacks Buzz's room, buys and eats whatever he wants, and watches violent movies. However, Kevin soon becomes frightened by his next door neighbor, Old Man Marley, who is rumored by Buzz to be a serial killer who murdered his own family in the 1950's, as well as the "Wet Bandits", Harry and Marv, a pair of burglars who have been breaking into other vacant houses in the neighborhood and have targeted the McCallisters' house. Kevin tricks them into thinking that his family is still home, forcing them to put their plans on hold.

Kate realizes mid-flight that Kevin was left behind. Upon arrival in Paris, the family discovers that all flights for the next two days are fully booked. While the rest of the family stay in Peter's brother's apartment, Kate manages to get a flight to the United States, but it is a flight to Dallas, Texas.

On Christmas Eve, Kate ends up in Scranton, Pennsylvania, where all flights to Chicago are fully booked. She ends up riding with a polka band who are driving to Milwaukee and whose leader, Gus Polinski, offered to let her ride with them to Chicago after overhearing her desperation to get home. Meanwhile, Harry and Marv finally realize that Kevin is home alone, and Kevin overhears them discussing plans to break into his house. Kevin starts to miss his family and asks the local Santa Claus impersonator if he could bring them back for Christmas. He goes to a church and watches a choir perform, then meets Old Man Marley, who dispels the rumors about him. He points out his granddaughter in the choir, whom he is unable to spend Christmas with, as he and his son are estranged; Kevin suggests that he should reconcile with his son.

Kevin returns home and rigs the house with booby traps to take on the burglars. Harry and Marv break in, spring the traps, and suffer various injuries. While the duo pursues Kevin around the house, he calls the police and flees, then lures Harry and Marv into a neighboring home which they previously broke into. They catch him and prepare to get their revenge, but Marley, who is next door checking on his son's house, intervenes and knocks them unconscious with his snow shovel. The police arrive and arrest Harry and Marv, having identified all the houses that they broke into due to Marv's destructive characteristic of flooding them.

On Christmas morning, Kevin is disappointed to find that his family is still gone. He then hears Kate enter the house and call for him; they reconcile and are soon joined by Peter, Buzz, Jeff, Megan, and Linnie, who managed to return by catching a flight to Dallas and then a connecting flight to Chicago. Kevin keeps silent about his encounter with Harry and Marv, although Peter finds Harry's knocked-out gold tooth. Kevin then observes Marley reuniting with his son, daughter-in-law, and granddaughter. Marley notices Kevin, and the pair wave to each other knowingly. The film ends with Kevin getting into trouble when Buzz discovers the mess in his room which Kevin went into earlier.

== Cast ==
- Macaulay Culkin as Kevin, an eight-year-old with a penchant for creating harmful inventions
- Joe Pesci as Harry, a thief who targets the McCallisters' home with Marv
- Daniel Stern as Marv, a thief who targets the McCallisters' home with Harry
- John Heard as Peter, Kevin's father
- Roberts Blossom as Marley, Kevin's elderly neighbor
- Catherine O'Hara as Kate, Kevin's mother
- Angela Goethals as Linnie, Kevin's older sister
- Devin Ratray as Buzz, Kevin's arrogant oldest brother
- Gerry Bamman as Uncle Frank, Peter's notoriously cheap and cantankerous brother
- Hillary Wolf as Megan, Kevin's oldest sister
- John Candy as Gus Polinski, a polka musician who helps Kate
- Larry Hankin as Officer Balzak
- Michael C. Maronna as Jeff, Kevin's older brother
- Kristin Minter as Heather, Kevin's oldest cousin
- Daiana Campeanu as Sondra, Kevin's older cousin
- Jedidiah Cohen as Rod, Kevin's older cousin and Rob's older son who is living with Uncle Frank and Aunt Leslie
- Kieran Culkin as Fuller, Kevin's youngest cousin
- Senta Moses as Tracy, Kevin's older cousin
- Anna Slotky as Brook, Kevin's younger cousin
- Terrie Snell as Aunt Leslie, Uncle Frank's wife and Kevin's aunt
- Jeffrey Wiseman as Mitch Murphy, eight-year-old neighbor of the McCallisters whom Heather mistakes for Kevin during the headcount
- Virginia Smith as Georgette, Kevin's aunt, wife of Uncle Rob, and mother of Heather, Rod, and Steffan
- Matt Doherty as Steffan, Kevin's older cousin and the son of Rob and Georgette
- Ralph Foody as gangster #1 (Johnny; character in the film Angels with Filthy Souls)
- Michael Guido as gangster #2 (Snakes; character in the film Angels with Filthy Souls)
- Ray Toler as Uncle Rob, Kevin's uncle, younger brother of Peter and Uncle Frank, and father of Heather, Rod, and Steffan
- Billie Bird as woman in airport (Irene, who sells Kate her ticket to Dallas)
- Bill Erwin as man in airport (Ed, Irene's husband who reluctantly agrees with Irene's ticket sale)
- Gerry Becker as officer #1
- Alan Wilder as Scranton ticket agent
- Hope Davis as French ticket agent
- Kenneth Hudson Campbell as Santa (local Claus impersonator to whom Kevin expresses his wish for a family reunion)
- Jim Ortlieb as Herb the drugstore clerk

Credits adapted from the American Film Institute.

== Production ==
=== Development ===
Writer and producer John Hughes conceived Home Alone while preparing to go on vacation. He said: "I was going away on vacation, and making a list of everything I didn't want to forget. I thought, 'Well, I'd better not forget my kids.' Then I thought, 'What if I left my 10-year-old son at home? What would he do?'" Hughes wrote eight pages of notes that developed into the screenplay. Imagining that children are naturally most scared of robbers, Hughes also worked that aspect into the plot of the film.

Home Alone was initially set to be financed and distributed by Warner Bros. Hughes promised that he could make the movie for less than $10 million, considerably less than most feature film production budgets of that era. Concerned that the film might exceed that amount, Hughes met secretly with 20th Century Fox before production to see if they would fund the project if Warner Bros. proved inflexible. According to executive producer Scott Rosenfelt, a copy of the script was "clandestinely" delivered to Fox, bypassing the legal restrictions that would have otherwise prevented Fox from seeing it until the project was in turnaround. Early in production, the budget grew to $14.7 million. Warner Bros. demanded that it be cut by $1.2 million; the producers responded with a memo arguing that the budget could not be cut any further. Unconvinced, Warner Bros. shut down production the next day, but it quickly resumed when Fox took up Hughes on his offer. The final budget grew to $18 million.

Hughes had asked Patrick Read Johnson to direct, but he was committed to directing Spaced Invaders (1990). He turned to Chris Columbus, who had left National Lampoon's Christmas Vacation (1989) before shooting started because of a personality clash with starring actor Chevy Chase, who Columbus said treated him "like dirt". Hughes gave him the scripts for both Home Alone and Reach the Rock (1998); Columbus chose to direct Home Alone, as he found it funnier and liked the Christmas theme. Columbus did an uncredited rewrite of the script; among his contributions was the character of Old Man Marley, which he created to give the story a more serious layer, as well as a more emotional, happier ending.

=== Casting ===
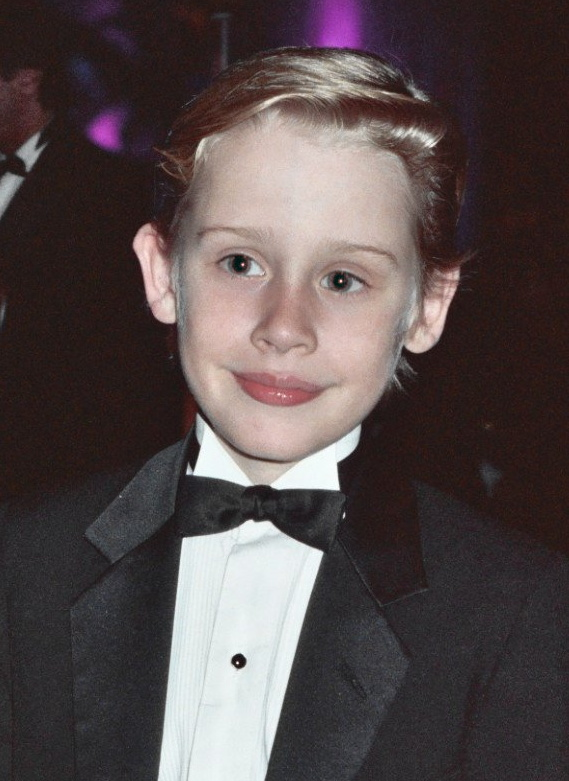
Macaulay Culkin (pictured in 1991) was the child star of the film.

Hughes suggested to Columbus that they cast Macaulay Culkin as Kevin, because of his experience while shooting Uncle Buck (1989). Columbus met with 200 other actors for the part, as he felt it was his "directorial responsibility". John Mulaney was asked to audition for the role of Kevin after being scouted in a children's sketch comedy group, but his parents refused the opportunity. Columbus finally met with Culkin and agreed he was the right choice.

Before Catherine O'Hara and John Heard would be cast as the parents, considerations for the roles included Susan Sarandon, Kirstie Alley, Blythe Danner, Joanna Cassidy and Candice Bergen for Kate, and Sam Waterston, David Dukes and Danny Aiello for Peter. James Stewart and Vincent Gardenia had been considered for the role of Marley before Roberts Blossom was chosen.

Robert De Niro was considered for the role of Harry, but after Jon Lovitz turned it down, Joe Pesci was cast. He informed the producers he was "offer only", so the producers did not audition him. Zack Norman was also considered before Pesci ultimately accepted the role. The role of Uncle Frank was written for Kelsey Grammer, but was given to Gerry Bamman when Grammer was unavailable.

Tim Curry and Joe Pantoliano both met with Columbus about playing Marv before Daniel Stern was cast. Before shooting started, Stern was told that the production schedule had been extended from six weeks to eight. He dropped out after as he would not be paid more for the extended schedule. Daniel Roebuck was hired to replace him, but after two days of rehearsal, Columbus felt he was lacking chemistry with Pesci and brought back Stern. Roebuck later said that, although he was upset to be fired from the production, he now believed the experience was "a little blip of unimportance". Chris Farley auditioned for the role of the Santa Claus impersonator, but he failed to impress Columbus.

John Candy was available for only one day to film his scenes, which took 23 hours to shoot. He was paid only $414, since he did the film as a favor to Hughes. In return, he was the only actor Hughes allowed to go off-script; according to Columbus, all his dialogue was improvised.

=== Filming ===
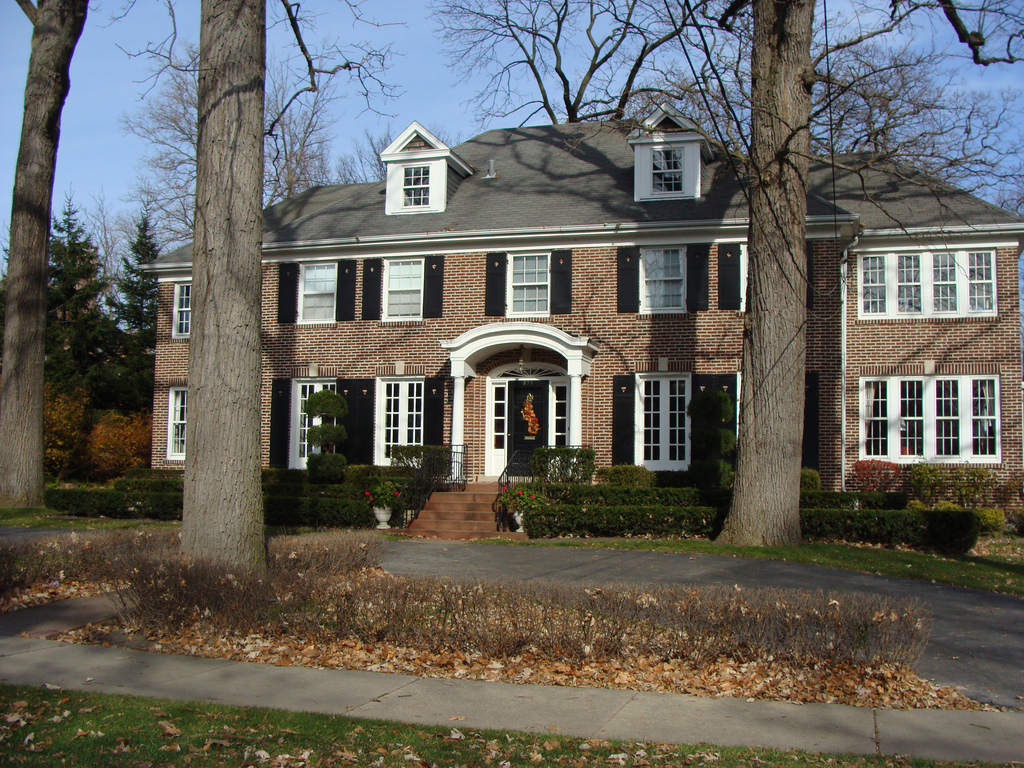
The Home Alone house in Winnetka, Illinois.

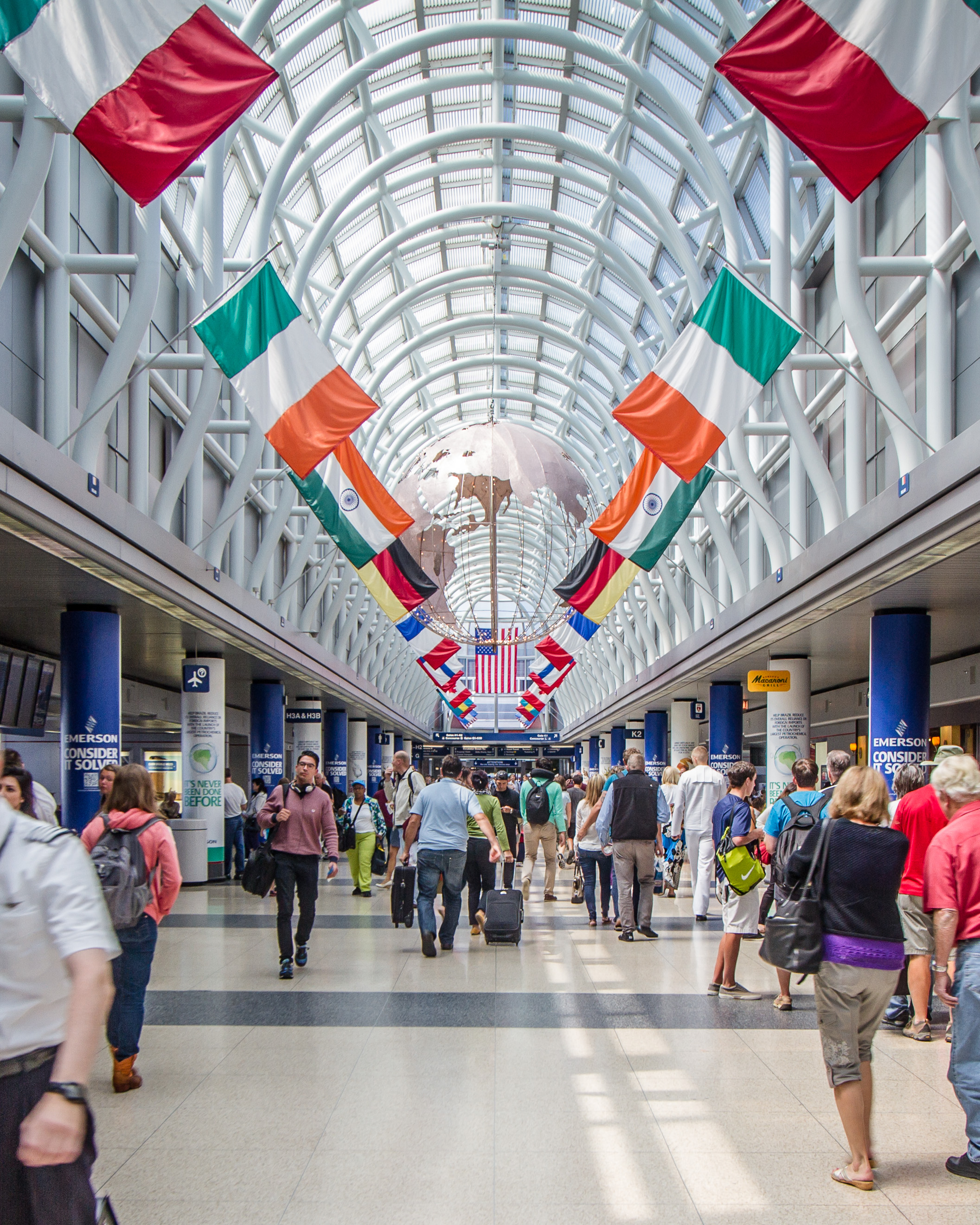
O'Hare International Airport featured in the film.

Principal photography took place from February 14, 1990, to May 8, 1990, over a course of 83 days on an $18.3 million budget. The house exterior scenes were filmed on location at a three-story single-family house located at 671 Lincoln Avenue in the North Shore village of Winnetka, Illinois, where many of Hughes's previous films had also been shot, but at different houses. The only interiors of the house used for filming that made it to the finished film were the main staircase, attic and most of the first floor landing, while all the other interiors of the house were duplicated on a sound stage to allow more room for equipment and crew. These sets were built in the then-disused gym of New Trier High School's west campus, previously used by Hughes for Uncle Buck and Ferris Bueller's Day Off, where the production company had already set up its offices. 671 Lincoln Avenue later became a tourist attraction. The tree house in the backyard was built specifically for the film and dismantled after filming ended.

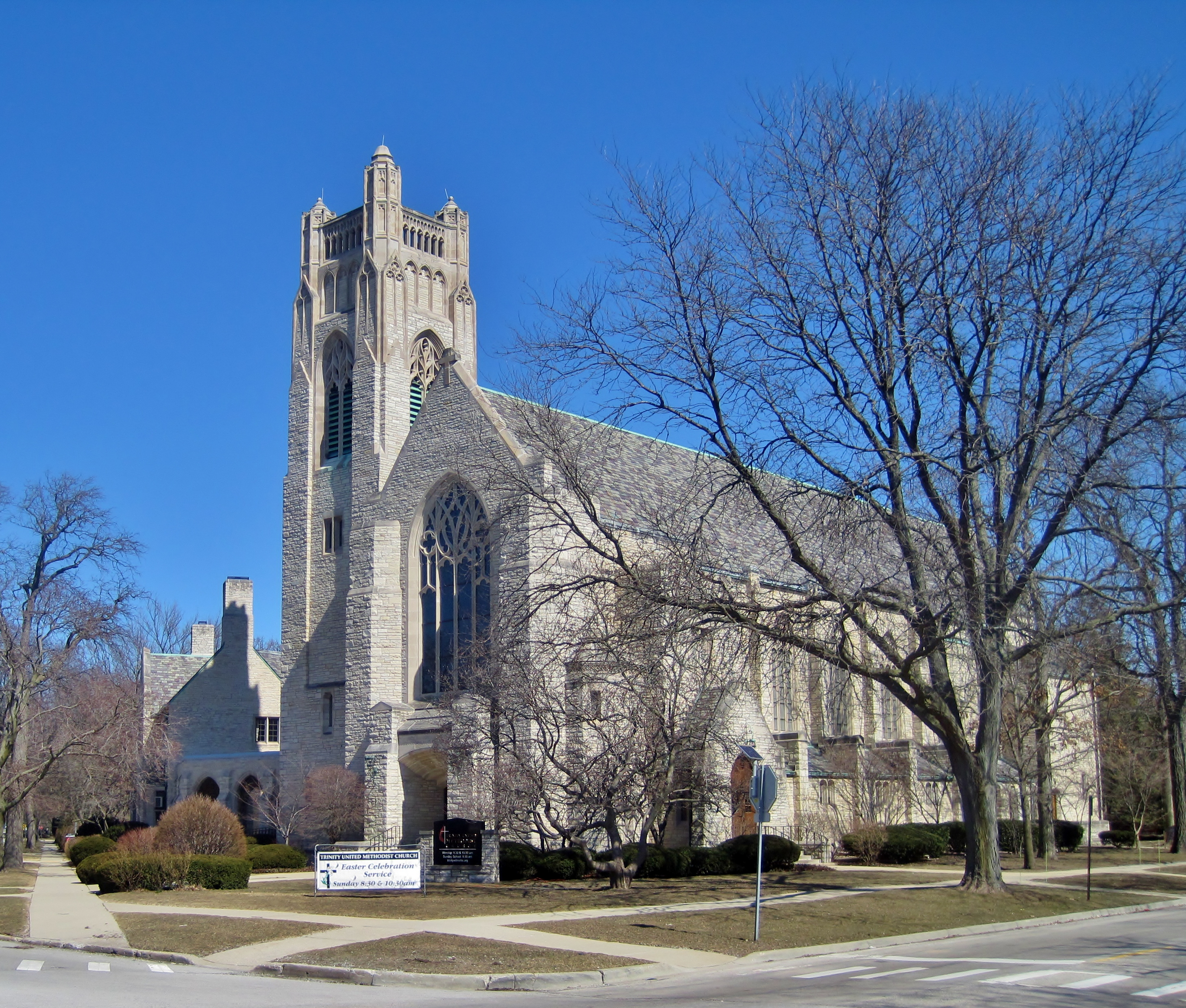
Trinity United Methodist Church in Wilmette, Illinois.

Kevin runs away from his third encounter with Marley in Hubbard Woods Park in Winnetka. In addition, the scene where Kevin wades in his neighbor's flooded basement was shot at the empty swimming pool of the aforementioned campus of New Trier High School, with the American Airlines DC-10 first class cabin interiors done on the basketball courts. The church exteriors were shot at Trinity United Methodist Church in Wilmette, Illinois, while the interiors were shot at Grace Episcopal Church in Oak Park, Illinois. Filming also took place over four sixteen-hour days at O'Hare International Airport, which served for both itself and Orly Airport in Paris. John Candy filmed his cameo appearance for the film over the course of one day at Meigs Field.

For the film within a film, Angels with Filthy Souls (the title of which parodies the 1938 crime film Angels with Dirty Faces), shooting took one day, on the final "test day" prior to the official start of principal photography. To create the illusion that the film was an authentic 1940s gangster film, the scene was filmed on black-and-white negative film, and Johnny's office featured props from that era. Like much of the film, most of the sequence was shot with low, wide angles that, according to journalist Darryn King, "capture the action as if a child were perceiving it". Originally, Ralph Foody was to play Snakes and Michael Guido was to play Johnny, but since Foody had recently undergone knee replacement surgery, he was unable to do the death scene where Snakes drops to his knees, leading to the roles being switched.

Cinematographer Julio Macat recalled that Pesci was more difficult to work with than Culkin. The older actor believed some of the dialogue was not of a quality commensurate with his acting ability. He also resented the early unit calls, since they prevented him from starting his day with nine holes of golf as he preferred to do. After he took the assistant director by the collar one day to complain about this, daily call times were moved back from 7 to 9 a.m. to accommodate his rounds. However, strict child labor laws limiting Culkin to a 10 p.m. finish meant the crew had limited time to shoot night scenes.

During the scene where Kate forces her son, Kevin, to sleep in the attic due to him misbehaving, O'Hara struggled to say the line "Then say it again, it'll maybe happen" as she found it horrific to say to a child.

Pesci said in a 2022 interview with People of working with Culkin, "I intentionally limited my interactions with him to preserve the dynamic" and made sure not "to come across on the screen that we were in any way friendly" in order to "maintain the integrity of the adversarial relationship".

On the set, Pesci and Stern both had difficulty refraining from cursing, which became annoying to Pesci, since Culkin was on set as well. The curse words that made it into the film were "shit", accidentally said by Daniel Stern when his shoe fell through the pet door, and "hell", which was said by both Pesci and Stern after their characters encounter one another after going through Kevin's booby traps and by Johnny to the character of Snakes in Angels with Filthy Souls. Pesci's use of "cartoon cursing", or menacing gibberish, garnered comparisons to Looney Tunes character Yosemite Sam.

The film's stunts also created tension for the crew during shooting. Columbus said, "Every time the stunt guys did one of those stunts it wasn't funny. We'd watch it, and I would just pray that the guys were alive." Stunts were originally prepared with safety harnesses, but because of their visibility on camera, the film's final stunts were performed without them. Troy Brown and Leon Delaney were stuntmen for Pesci and Stern, respectively. An injury had occurred between Pesci and Culkin during one of the rehearsals for the scene in which Harry tries to bite off Kevin's finger; Culkin still has the scar. The tarantula that walks on Stern's face was real.

Senta Moses, who played Tracy, recalled in 2020 that one of the most difficult scenes to shoot was the family's run through O'Hare International Airport to catch their flight. While it does not last long, it required several days to film. "There were thousands of extras, all expertly choreographed so none of us would be in danger running at full speed through the American Airlines terminal", she told The Hollywood Reporter. "And we ran at full speed. Sometimes we'd bump into each other, like a multi-car pileup on the expressway, and just crack up laughing ... There were so many setups and narrowly missed moments of disaster, but to my knowledge, no one got hurt."

== Music ==
Columbus initially hoped to have Bruce Broughton score the film, and early posters listed him as the composer. However, Broughton was busy with The Rescuers Down Under (1990), and he had to cancel at the last minute. Columbus then jokingly suggested getting John Williams for the film as a replacement but soon considered the idea and was later able to get in touch with Steven Spielberg, who helped him contact Williams to produce the final score. Traditional Christmas songs, such as "O Holy Night" and "Carol of the Bells", are featured prominently in the film, as well as the film's theme song "Somewhere in My Memory". The soundtrack was released by Sony Classical Records on cassette on December 4, 1990, and on CD on May 27, 2015.

== Release ==
=== Theatrical ===
Home Alone had a sneak preview screening for about 1,000 theaters on November 10, 1990. The advanced screening proved successful, with 5% of the preview audience returning for its official release the following week. Originally scheduled to be released on Thanksgiving weekend, its opening date was brought forward to avoid competition with Three Men and a Little Lady. It was given a wide release on November 16, 1990.

=== Home media ===
Home Alone was first released by Fox Video on VHS and LaserDisc in the United States on August 22, 1991, their first video to go direct to sell-through rather than to the video rental market first. It sold 11 million copies, generating Fox revenue of $150 million making it, along with E.T. the Extra-Terrestrial, the highest-selling video of all time at that point. Due to the sales, the film did not perform as well in the rental market.

It was later released on DVD on October 5, 1999, as a basic package. The film was released on Blu-ray on December 2, 2008, titled Family Fun Edition, and was released alongside Home Alone 2: Lost in New York in a collection pack on October 5, 2010. The film was reissued again on DVD and Blu-ray on October 6, 2015, alongside all four of its sequels in a box set titled Home Alone: 25th Anniversary Ultimate Collector's Christmas Edition.

On September 15, 2020, Walt Disney Studios Home Entertainment and 20th Century Home Entertainment released Home Alone on Ultra HD Blu-ray in time for its 30th anniversary in the United States.

== Reception ==
=== Box office ===
Home Alone grossed $285.8 million in the United States and Canada and $190.9 million in other countries for a worldwide total of $476.7 million, against a production budget of $18 million. In its opening weekend, Home Alone grossed $17 million from 1,202 theaters, averaging $14,211 per site and just 6% of the final total and added screens over the next six weeks, rising to 2,174 screens during its eighth weekend.

Home Alone was the number-one film at the box office for 12 consecutive weeks, from its release weekend of November 16–18, 1990, through the weekend of February 1–3, 1991. It was removed from the top spot when Sleeping with the Enemy opened with $13 million. It remained in the top ten until the weekend of April 26, well past Easter weekend. It made two more appearances in the top ten (the weekend of May 31 – June 2 and the weekend of June 14–16) before finally falling out of the top ten. After over nine months into its run, the film had earned 16x its debut weekend and ended up making a final gross of $285,761,243, the top-grossing film of its year in North America. The film is listed in the Guinness World Records as the highest-grossing live-action comedy ever and held the record until it was overtaken by The Hangover Part II in 2011. As for the record for being highest-grossing live-action comedy film domestically, it would last until 2023 when Barbie surpassed it.

By the time the film had run its course in theaters, Home Alone was the third-highest-grossing film of all time worldwide, as well as in the United States and Canada, behind only Star Wars ($322 million at the time) and E.T. the Extra-Terrestrial ($399 million at the time), according to the home video box. Box Office Mojo estimates that the film sold over 67.7 million tickets in the United States. It was also the highest-grossing Christmas film until it was surpassed by Dr. Seuss' The Grinch in 2018. The film made Culkin a child star.

=== Critical response ===
Upon release, Home Alone received mixed reviews from critics. On review aggregator Rotten Tomatoes, Home Alone holds an approval rating of 66% based on 116 reviews, with an average rating of 5.9/10. The website's critical consensus reads, "Home Alone's uneven but frequently funny premise stretched unreasonably thin is buoyed by Macaulay Culkin's cute performance and strong supporting stars." On Metacritic, the film has a weighted average score of 63 out of 100 based on nine critics, indicating "generally favorable" reviews. Audiences polled by CinemaScore gave the film an average grade of "A" on an A+ to F scale.

Variety magazine praised the film for its cast. Jeanne Cooper of The Washington Post praised the film for its comedic approach. Hal Hinson, also of The Washington Post, praised Columbus's direction and Culkin's performance. Although Caryn James of The New York Times complained that the film's first half is "flat and unsurprising as its cute little premise suggests", she praised the second half for its slapstick humor. She also praised the dialogue between Kevin and Marley, as well as the film's final scenes. Roger Ebert of the Chicago Sun-Times gave the film a 2 1/2 out of a 4-star rating. He compared the elaborate booby-traps in the film to Rube Goldberg machines, writing "they're the kinds of traps that any 8-year-old could devise, if he had a budget of tens of thousands of dollars and the assistance of a crew of movie special effects people" and criticized the plot as "so implausible that it makes it hard for [him] to really care about the plight of the kid [Kevin]". However, he praised Culkin's performance.

Owen Gleiberman of Entertainment Weekly magazine gave the film a "D" grade, criticizing the film for its "sadistic festival of adult-bashing". Gleiberman said that John Hughes "is pulling our strings as though he'd never learn to do anything else". Peter Bradshaw of The Guardian gave the film three out of five and praised Culkin's "vivid screen presence, almost incandescent with confidence". However, he criticized his acting, calling it "a bit broad and mannered". Ali Barclay of the BBC wrote, "Culkin walks a fine line between annoyance and endearment throughout the film." He also called Home Alone "a film which manages to capture some of the best qualities of Christmas".

Naomi Barnwell of Roobla said that "Home Alone has all the ingredients that make for a great kids' film". Adrian Turner of Radio Times called the movie "a celebration of enterprise that captured the heart and wickedness of every child on the planet." According to TV Guide, "[Home Alone]'s slapstick falls flat and only the pain remains." Peter Rainer of the Los Angeles Times criticized the gags, writing they leave "a sour aftertaste". He added "this film plays better as a trailer than as a full-length film" when a trailer lets viewers appreciate those "without having to fight off a lot of unsettling associations".

=== Legacy ===
Home Alone gradually became a Christmas classic. It was praised for its quotable phrases, traps, and main character. Hannah-Rose Yee of Stylist called the ending "very sweet" and praised the score from John Williams, calling it "fantastic". Christopher Hooton of The Independent also praised the film, calling the film-within-a-film Angels with Filthy Souls "a fond footnote in cinema history". Matt Talbot from Simcoe.com said that the Wet Bandits were "fantastic" and "never [got] old" on "repeat viewings". Michael Walsh of Nerdist noted the church scene as "One of the best, most touching scenes [in the film]".

Home Alone remains a highly popular Christmas movie in Poland, when it is played on Polsat every Christmas Eve. In 2010, Polsat originally excluded Home Alone from its program plan, which caused over 90,000 people to protest on Facebook; Polsat eventually reversed the decision. In 2016, over 4.44 million Poles tuned in to Polsat to watch Home Alone. Since the 2010s, its TV trailers even include a tagline that acknowledges this popularity: "Christmas without [Kevin]? It's absolutely impossible!".

Julio Macat, the film's cinematographer, considers Home Alone his favorite film out of all the projects he has shot. It was the favorite film of former U.S. President Gerald Ford.

=== Accolades ===
At the 12th Youth in Film Awards, Macaulay Culkin won Best Young Actor Starring in a Motion Picture. The film was nominated for two Academy Awards, one for Best Original Score, which was written by John Williams, and the other for Best Original Song for "Somewhere in My Memory", music by Williams and lyrics by Leslie Bricusse, but lost to Dances with Wolves and Dick Tracy respectively.

| Award | Category | Nominee(s) | Result |
|---|---|---|---|
| Academy Awards | Best Original Score | John Williams | Nominated |
| Academy Awards | Best Original Song | "Somewhere in My Memory"; Music by John Williams; Lyrics by Leslie Bricusse | Nominated |
| American Comedy Awards | Funniest Actor in a Motion Picture (Leading Role) | Macaulay Culkin | Won |
| Artios Awards | Outstanding Achievement in Feature Film Casting – Comedy | Jane Jenkins and Jane Hirshenson | Won |
| BMI Film & TV Awards | Film Music Award | John Williams | Won |
| British Comedy Awards | Best Comedy Film | | Won |
| Chicago Film Critics Association Awards | Most Promising Actor | Macaulay Culkin | Won |
| Golden Globe Awards | Best Motion Picture – Musical or Comedy | | Nominated |
| Golden Globe Awards | Best Actor in a Motion Picture – Musical or Comedy | Macaulay Culkin | Nominated |
| Golden Screen Awards | | | Won |
| Grammy Awards | Best Song Written Specifically for a Motion Picture or for Television | "Somewhere in My Memory"; Music by John Williams; Lyrics by Leslie Bricusse | Nominated |
| Kids' Choice Awards | Favorite Movie | | Won |
| Online Film & Television Association Awards | Hall of Fame – Motion Picture | | Won |
| Young Artist Awards | Most Entertaining Family Youth Motion Picture – Comedy/Action | | Won |
| Young Artist Awards | Best Young Actor Starring in a Motion Picture | Macaulay Culkin | Won |
| Young Artist Awards | Best Young Actress Supporting Role in a Motion Picture | Angela Goethals | Nominated |

=== Accusations of plagiarism ===
The 1989 French horror thriller film 3615 code Père Noël, which is about a young boy who is home alone with his elderly grandfather and has to fend off a home invader dressed up as Santa Claus, has been noted for its plot similarities to Home Alone. 3615 code Père Noël director René Manzor threatened the producers of Home Alone with legal action on the grounds of plagiarism, alleging that Home Alone was a remake of his film. 3615 code Père Noël was not released in the United States during its original theatrical run in January 1990 and did not become widely available there until 2018.

== Use in media ==
The music video for Snoop Dogg's 1994 song "Gin and Juice" opens with a gag where, after a teenaged Snoop's parents have left him to watch the house in their absence, he places his hands to his face and yells in the manner of Kevin McCallister in the first film, while a title comes on screen reading "Home Boy Alone".

In December 2015, Culkin reprised his role as an adult Kevin McCallister in the inaugural episode of the Jack Dishel web series DRYVRS in which a visibly disturbed McCallister recounts his experiences from the events of the first film and subsequently uses his signature tactics against a gunman. In response, Daniel Stern posted a short video reprising his role as Marv, released in conjunction with Stern's Reddit AMA, pleading for support from Harry against McCallister's traps.

The 2016 Christmas-set horror film Better Watch Out includes a scene where a character who is obsessed with the Home Alone films demonstrates how, in real life, it would be deadly for someone to be hit in the face with a paint can swung from a distance.

The season 13 episode of It's Always Sunny in Philadelphia "Charlie's Home Alone" is intended to be a direct parody of the first Home Alone film. In the episode, Charlie Kelly is accidentally forgotten while the rest of "the gang" attend Super Bowl LII. Charlie mistakenly believes he must protect the bar by setting up traps, only for himself to accidentally activate said traps, nearly preventing from performing his Super Bowl "rituals".

On December 15, 2018, Culkin made a guest appearance as himself in an episode of Angry Video Game Nerd to review multiple video game adaptations of the first two Home Alone films, as well as a gameplay session of The Pagemaster with James Rolfe and Mike Matei in the days following that episode's release.

On December 19, 2018, Culkin reprised his role as McCallister in a 60-second advertisement for Google Assistant titled Home Alone Again, which parodies the original film. The commercial contains shot-for-shot remakes of several scenes from the film in which McCallister uses several of the product's functions. The concluding scene involves a command sequence intended to make the house look active, parodying the original "Rockin' Around the Christmas Tree" scene.

Home Alone is prominently referred to in the 2022 Christmas action comedy film Violent Night, in which the character Trudy Lightston, a fan of the film, imitates Kevin's booby traps against burglars who take her family hostage.

== Other media ==
=== Novelization ===
Home Alone (ISBN 0-590-55066-7) was novelized by Todd Strasser and published by Scholastic in 1990 to coincide with the film. On October 6, 2015, to celebrate the 25th anniversary of the movie, an illustrated book (ISBN 1-594-74858-6) by Kim Smith and Quirk Books was released.

=== Sequels and franchise ===
The film was followed by a commercially successful sequel in 1992, Home Alone 2: Lost in New York, which brought back most of the first film's cast. Culkin was paid $4.5 million to appear in the sequel, compared to $110,000 for the original. The film within a film, Angels with Filthy Souls, had a sequel in Home Alone 2, Angels with Even Filthier Souls. Both Angels meta-films featured character actor Ralph Foody as stereotypical 1930s mobster Johnny. A third film, Home Alone 3, was released in 1997; it has entirely different actors and characters as well as a different storyline, with Hughes writing the screenplay.

A television film followed in 2002: Home Alone 4: Taking Back the House. The movie features some of the same characters who were in the first two films, but with a new cast and a storyline. The fifth film, Home Alone: The Holiday Heist, premiered during ABC Family's Countdown to 25 Days of Christmas programming event on November 25, 2012. Similarly to the third film, it does not focus on the McCallister family. Chris Columbus later revealed that there had been discussions on a sequel starring Kevin's son: "This was talked about maybe 10 years ago – I don't know, we were just having fun with it – and we said, 'What if Kevin is an adult and he has a kid?' But it was still Pesci and Stern – Pesci and Stern are still obsessed with this kid. They're going to get this kid." Another idea that was once discussed involved an adult Kevin attempting revenge on Harry and Marv, who have reformed in the years since they last met. The studio declined to make the film despite Columbus & Culkin's interest in the idea.

A sixth film was released digitally on Disney+ on November 12, 2021, titled Home Sweet Home Alone. Devin Ratray, who played Buzz McCallister in the first two films, reprised his role in the film.

On November 20, 2026, Columbus stated that another Home Alone film couldn't happen following Catherine O'Hara's death. However, that same day, a seventh film was reported to be in early development, with Culkin reprising his role as Kevin and Seth Rogen and Evan Goldberg producing the film under their studio Point Grey Pictures.

== See also ==
- List of films featuring home invasions, a plot device in thriller films that Home Alone lampoons
- List of films featuring fictional films
- List of Christmas films
- Home Alone (video game)
