= Ralph Foody =

American actor (1928–1999)

- Foody in Home Alone (1990)
- Born: Ralph Wesley Foody; November 13, 1928; Chicago, Illinois, U.S.
- Died: November 21, 1999 (aged 71); Lexington, Kentucky, U.S.
- Resting place: Lexington Cemetery, Lexington
- Education: Marquette University; Goodman School of Drama
- Occupation: Actor
- Years active: 1965–1992
- Notable work: Home Alone, Home Alone 2: Lost in New York

Ralph Wesley Foody (November 13, 1928 – November 21, 1999) was an American character actor, known to film audiences for his roles in various Chicago-shot productions during the 1980s and 1990s. He was best known for playing the 1930s gangster Johnny in Home Alone (1990) and its first sequel Home Alone 2: Lost in New York (1992).

== Early life and education ==
Ralph Wesley Foody was born in Chicago, Illinois on November 13, 1928. He graduated with a journalism degree from Marquette University and studied acting at the Goodman Theatre.

== Career ==
Foody appeared had a prolific stage career, appearing in various regional, touring, and repertory productions throughout Illinois and the Midwest. During the 1960s, he was a member of the Peninsula Players in Door County, Wisconsin.

One of his more prominent film parts was as the alcoholic and negligent Detective Cragie in the Chuck Norris action movie Code of Silence. Foody also played a police dispatcher in The Blues Brothers and a police captain in the Arnold Schwarzenegger movie Raw Deal. He appeared in three films directed by Andrew Davis, and two by Costa-Gavras.

He played 1930s mobster Johnny in the 1990 film Home Alone and Home Alone 2: Lost in New York in 1992. As Johnny, Foody appears in two black-and-white gangster films-within-the-films Angels with Filthy Souls and its sequel Angels with Even Filthier Souls (both are a parody of the 1938 film Angels with Dirty Faces by Warner Bros.). His appearances are notable for the famous catchphrases 'Keep the change ya filthy animal' and 'Merry Christmas ya filthy animal – and a Happy New Year'. His appearance in Home Alone 2: Lost in New York was also his final acting role. Originally, he was intended to play Snakes, the character whom Johnny kills in the first Angels with Filthy Souls and Michael Guido was intended to play Johnny. However, having just undergone a knee replacement surgery, he was unable to do the death scene where Snakes drops to his knees, leading to the roles being reversed.

== Personal life and death ==
Foody married his wife Jan in 1956, the couple had two children.

After 1991, Foody retired from show business and moved with his wife to Lexington, Kentucky, where the two helped found the Ballet Theatre.

Foody died of cancer in Lexington, on November 21, 1999, at the age of 71.

== Filmography ==
Year	Title	Role	Director	Notes
1965	Mickey One	Police Captain	Arthur Penn	
1980	The Blues Brothers	Chicago Police Dispatcher	John Landis	
1981	Chicago Story	Sergeant Hesper	Harvey S. Laidman & Jerry London	Made-for-TV movie
1984	The Lost Honor of Kathryn Beck	Bit Role	Simon Langton	Made-for-TV movie
1985	Lady Blue	Howe	Gary Nelson	Made into TV series
1985	Lady Blue	Captain Flynn	Various	14 episodes
1985	Code of Silence	Detective Cragie	Andrew Davis	Chuck Norris film
1986	Raw Deal	Captain Sam Joyce	John Irvin	
1988	Vice Versa	Doorman	Brian Gilbert	
1988	Above the Law	Federal Clerk	Andrew Davis	
1988	Betrayed	Lyle	Costa-Gavras	
1989	The Package	Building Manager	Andrew Davis	
1989	Music Box	Pawn Broker	Costa-Gavras	
1989	Cold Justice	Ernie	Terry Green	
1990	Gabriel's Fire	Hot Dog Vendor	Robert Lieberman	Episode; "Gabriel's Fire"
1990	Home Alone	Gangster Johnny	Chris Columbus	In the scene from a film on TV "Angels with Filthy Souls"
1991	Curly Sue	Drifter	John Hughes	
1992	Straight Talk	Desk Clerk	Barnet Kellman	
1992	The Babe	Pittsburgh Man	Arthur Hiller	Bit role
1992	Home Alone 2: Lost in New York	Gangster Johnny	Chris Columbus	In the scene from a film on TV "Angels with Even Filthier Souls" and final acting role
