= Raja Gosnell =

American film editor and director (born 1958)

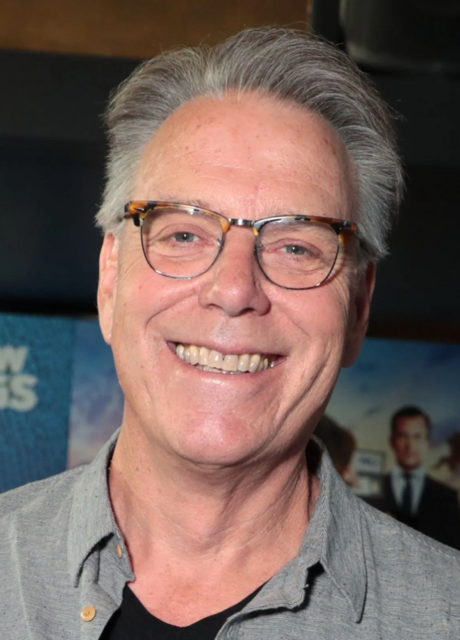
- Gosnell in 2018
- Born: Raja Raymond Gosnell; December 9, 1958 (age 67); Los Angeles, California, U.S.
- Occupations: Film director; editor
- Years active: 1978–present

Raja Raymond Gosnell (born December 9, 1958) is an American film editor and director. He is known for directing comedies and family films. Among his best known works are Home Alone 3 (1997), Never Been Kissed (1999), Big Momma's House (2000), the theatrical Scooby-Doo films (2002 and 2004), Yours, Mine & Ours (2005) and Sony Pictures Animation's live-action Smurfs films (2011 and 2013).

== Early life ==
Gosnell is named after his father's friend Raja Mohideen. He was born in Los Angeles, California on December 9, 1958.

Gosnell has traced his interest in editing to a middle-school project shot on his father's Super-8 camera. He filmed around the school without a plan and assembled the footage in no particular order, then screened it to the Paul McCartney song "Another Day". Images and song ended together by coincidence, which he later described as showing him what editing could do. From that point he set out to become a film editor, and has said that editing was his route into the industry.

== Career ==
=== Editing ===
Gosnell's career started in 1980 when he worked with director Robert Altman as an assistant editor on Popeye. His first solo credit as an editor was on the film The Silence. Afterward, Gosnell would serve as editor on a number of films, including Teen Wolf Too, Pretty Woman, and Rookie of the Year.

He is also known for his collaboration with director Chris Columbus, for whom he edited the films Home Alone (1990), Home Alone 2: Lost in New York (1992), and Mrs. Doubtfire (1993). Gosnell has attributed his sense of comic timing to watching Chuck Jones's Bugs Bunny cartoons as a child, and has said that it fed directly into his editing of Home Alone.

=== Directing ===
Gosnell made his directorial debut with Home Alone 3 after learning writer and producer John Hughes was looking for a director for the project. He has said that the studios approached him about family films because of his work for Columbus, who had made a series of commercially successful pictures for family audiences during their time together, and that Home Alone 3 was a straightforward choice given that he had edited the first two films in the series. Afterwards, he went on to direct more theatrical films, including Never Been Kissed (1999), Big Momma's House (2000), Scooby-Doo (2002), Scooby-Doo 2: Monsters Unleashed (2004), Beverly Hills Chihuahua (2008) and The Smurfs (2011) and its sequel, The Smurfs 2 (2013). While many of his films have been met with poor reception from critics, they have generally been very successful at the box office. In 2021, Gosnell co-directed his son, Bradley, in Gun and a Hotel Bible alongside Alicia Joy LeBlanc.

Describing his approach in 2013, Gosnell said he read a script scene by scene to establish what each was for - comedy, emotion or exposition - and then looked for the most entertaining way to achieve it, rather than composing shots with a child viewer in mind. He said the audience only entered his thinking at the preview stage, and that on expensive films the reactions of preview audiences were taken seriously enough to remove material from the final cut. He gave as an example a scene cut from The Smurfs 2 involving Brendan Gleeson's character.

== Filmography ==
Director

Key
| † | Denotes films that have not yet been released |

| Year | Title | Notes | Ref |
|---|---|---|---|
| 1997 | Home Alone 3 | | |
| 1999 | Never Been Kissed | | |
| 2000 | Big Momma's House | | |
| 2002 | Scooby-Doo | | |
| 2004 | Scooby-Doo 2: Monsters Unleashed | | |
| 2005 | Yours, Mine & Ours | | |
| 2008 | Beverly Hills Chihuahua | | |
| 2011 | The Smurfs | | |
| 2013 | The Smurfs 2 | | |
| 2018 | Show Dogs | Also executive producer | |
| 2021 | Gun and a Hotel Bible | Co-directed with Alicia Joy LeBlanc | |

Executive producer only

- Smurfs: The Lost Village (2017)

Editor

| Year | Title | Notes |
|---|---|---|
| 1978 | Remember My Name | Assistant editor |
| 1979 | Quintet | Assistant editor (Credited as Raja R. Gosnell) |
| 1979 | A Perfect Couple | Assistant film editor |
| 1980 | Health | Assistant editor (Credited as Raja R. Gosnell) |
| 1980 | Popeye | Assistant editor (Credited as Raja R. Gosnell) |
| 1982 | Making Love | Assistant editor (Credited as Raja R. Gosnell) |
| 1983 | Yellowbeard | Assistant editor (Credited as Raja R. Gosnell) |
| 1984 | The Lonely Guy | |
| 1986 | Monster in the Closet | |
| 1986 | Weekend Warriors | |
| 1986 | The Return of Billy Jack | Unfinished |
| 1987 | Teen Wolf Too | |
| 1987 | Good Morning, Vietnam | Additional editor |
| 1988 | D.O.A. | |
| 1988 | Heartbreak Hotel | |
| 1990 | Pretty Woman | |
| 1990 | Home Alone | |
| 1991 | My Heroes Have Always Been Cowboys | Editor (Rodeo sequence) |
| 1991 | Only the Lonely | |
| 1992 | Home Alone 2: Lost in New York | |
| 1993 | Rookie of the Year | |
| 1993 | Mrs. Doubtfire | |
| 1994 | Exit to Eden | Additional film editor |
| 1994 | Miracle on 34th Street | |
| 1995 | Nine Months | |
