= Christian Martyn =

Canadian actor (born 2000)

- Born: February 23, 2000 (age 26); Oakville, Ontario, Canada
- Other name: Chris Martyn
- Education: Iroquois Ridge High School
- Occupation: Actor
- Years active: 2010–present

External image
- Martyn in February 2014.

Christian Martyn (born February 23, 2000) is a Canadian actor best known for his role as Finn Baxter in Home Alone: The Holiday Heist (2012).

== Early life and career ==
Christian Martyn was born the son of single mother Lori (née Zabrok) Martyn. He has an older brother and an older sister. Martyn is originally from Oakville, Ontario and participated in a Hansel and Gretel play in Grade 2. In 2009, he participated in a competition in Los Angeles bagged four iPOP awards including best TV commercial and child actor of the year. He subsequently auditioned for Snowmen (2010) before playing the introverted Finn Baxter in Home Alone: The Holiday Heist (2012). While attending grade 11 at Iroquois Ridge High School, he played the role of Billy Andrews in Anne.

== Filmography ==
| Year | Film | Role | Notes |
|---|---|---|---|
| 2010 | Snowmen | Lucas Lamb | |
| 2011 | Citizen Gangster | Billy Boyd | |
| 2011 | Exit Humanity | Adam Young | |
| 2013 | Breakout (Split Decision) | Mikey | |

=== Television ===
| Year | Film | Role | Channel | Notes |
|---|---|---|---|---|
| 2011–2012 | Franklin and Friends | Rabbit (voice) | Treehouse TV | Recurring role (seasons 1-2) |
| 2012 | Monster Math Squad | Hockey Math Monitor | Wildbrain | 6 episodes |
| 2012 | Home Alone: The Holiday Heist | Finn Baxter | ABC Family | Television film |
| 2013 | Wild Kratts | Boy | PBS Kids Go! | 1 episode |
| 2013 | Be My Valentine | Tyler | Hallmark Channel | Television film |
| 2017–2019 | Anne with an E | Billy Andrews | CBC | Recurring roles (seasons 1-3) |
| 2019–2023 | Workin' Moms | Jacob Szalinsky | CBC | 13 episodes (seasons 3-7) |
| 2019 | Northern Rescue | Jason Jouris | CBC Gem | 7 episodes |
| 2026 | Murdoch Mysteries | Alan Grant | CBC Gem | 1 episode (Fire in the Sky) |
