= Home Alone (soundtrack) =

1990 album by John Williams

Home Alone: Original Motion Picture Soundtrack

Film score by John Williams
- Released: December 4, 1990
- Recorded: September – November 1990
- Studio: 20th Century Fox Scoring Stage
- Genres: Film soundtrack; classical
- Length: 56:58
- Label: CBS Masterworks

John Williams chronology
Stanley & Iris (1990)	Home Alone: Original Motion Picture Soundtrack (1990)	Hook (1991)

Home Alone chronology
Home Alone (1990)	Home Alone 2 (1992)

Singles from Home Alone: Original Motion Picture Soundtrack
- 1. "Somewhere in My Memory" Released: 1990

Home Alone: Original Motion Picture Soundtrack is the soundtrack of the 1990 film of the same name. The score was composed and conducted by John Williams, performed by the Hollywood Studio Symphony, and nominated for the Academy Award for Best Original Score; the film's signature tune "Somewhere in My Memory" was nominated for the Academy Award for Best Original Song and the Grammy Award for Best Song Written for Visual Media.

"Somewhere in My Memory" was written to "run alongside the film" by Williams, with lyrics by Leslie Bricusse. It can be heard in numerous sections of the film, either in full length or fragments, forming the backbone for the film's soundtrack. "Somewhere in My Memory" is performed in many Christmas concerts in schools or professional orchestras and choirs alike across the globe. A version in Spanish was recorded in Spain for the ending credits of Home Alone 2: Lost in New York. This version was performed by singer Ana Belén and is entitled "Sombras de otros tiempos" ("Shadows of Other/Former Times"). "Making the Plane" is inspired by Trepak by Tchaikovsky.

== Track listing ==
All tracks written and conducted by John Williams except where noted.

No.	Title	Performer	Length
1.	"Theme from Home Alone ("Somewhere in My Memory")" (lyrics: Leslie Bricusse, music: John Williams)		4:53
2.	"Holiday Flight"		0:59
3.	"The House"		2:27
4.	"Star of Bethlehem"		2:51
5.	"Man of the House"		4:32
6.	"White Christmas"	The Drifters	2:40
7.	"Scammed by a Kindergartener"		3:55
8.	"Please Come Home for Christmas"	Southside Johnny Lyon	2:41
9.	"Follow That Kid!"		2:03
10.	"Making the Plane"		0:57
11.	"O Holy Night ("Cantique de Noël")" (Adolphe Adam)		2:48
12.	"Carol of the Bells" (Mykola Leontovych)		1:24
13.	"Star of Bethlehem" (Bricusse, Williams)		2:59
14.	"Setting the Trap"		2:12
15.	"Somewhere in My Memory" (Bricusse, Williams)		1:04
16.	"The Attack on the House"		6:53
17.	"Mom Returns and Finale"		4:19
18.	"Have Yourself a Merry Little Christmas"	Mel Tormé	3:06
19.	"We Wish You a Merry Christmas/End Title" (Traditional, Williams)		4:15

== Charts ==
Chart performance for Home Alone: Original Motion Picture Soundtrack
Chart (2017–2025)	Peak position
Belgian Albums (Ultratop Wallonia)	140
Canadian Albums (Billboard)	71
Croatian International Albums (HDU)	33
Dutch Albums (Album Top 100)	38
German Albums (Offizielle Top 100)	40
Hungarian Albums (MAHASZ)	27
Irish Albums (IRMA)	60
Latvian Albums (LaIPA)	60
Norwegian Albums (VG-lista)	23
Polish Albums (ZPAV)	9
Swedish Albums (Sverigetopplistan)	60
Swiss Albums (Schweizer Hitparade)	73
US Billboard 200	96

== Expanded score ==
Home Alone – Expanded Original Motion Picture Score

Soundtrack album by John Williams
- Released: November 23, 2011
- Genre: Classical
- Length: 78:48
- Labels: La-La Land Records; Fox Music

=== Track listing ===
1. "Somewhere in My Memory" – 3:24
2. "Star of Bethlehem" (orchestral version) – 2:54
3. "Theme from Home Alone" – 1:27
4. "Go Pack Your Suitcase/Introducing Marley/In Good Hands" – 1:51
5. "Banished to the Attic" – 1:07
6. "We Slept In/Hand Count" – 1:20
7. "Making the Plane" – 0:54
8. "The Basement" – 2:18
9. "Target Practice/Sledding on the Stairs" – 1:31
10. "Lights On/Guess Who's Home/Paris Arrival" – 3:18
11. "The Man Of The House / Police Check" – 1:22
12. "The Bookshelf" – 1:10
13. "Phone Machine / Drug Store / Escape Across The Ice" – 3:06
14. "Follow That Kid!" – 2:12
15. "Listening To Carson" – 0:44
16. "Cleaning Clothes / Kitchen" – 1:39
17. "Scammed By A Kindergartner" – 2:10
18. "Walking Home (Somewhere In My Memory)" – 1:06
19. "O Holy Night - 2:51
20. "Star Of Bethlehem" – 3:00
21. "Carol Of The Bells" – 1:27
22. "Setting The Trap" – 2:31
23. "The Attack Begins" – 1:30
24. "Marv Enters The Basement / A Hot Hand / Sore Head" – 2:50
25. "Paint Cans" – 2:06
26. "Clothesline Trapeze / Marley To The Rescue" – 4:13
27. "The Next Morning / Mom Returns / Finale" – 4:26
28. "We Wish You A Merry Christmas / End Title (Somewhere In My Memory)" – 4:19
29. "Walking Home [Without Chorus]" – 1:05
30. "Clothesline Trapeze [Film Version Insert]" – 0:23
31. "Jingle Bells" – 1:02
32. "Christmas Carol Medley" – 7:43
33. "Finale [Alternate Version - O Holy Night]" – 1:34
34. "We Wish You A Merry Christmas / End Title (Somewhere In My Memory)" – 4:15

== Awards ==
Award	Category	Recipient(s)	Result
Academy Award	Best Original Score	John Williams	Nominated
Academy Award	Best Original Song for "Somewhere in My Memory"	John Williams and Leslie Bricusse	Nominated
