= Home Alone (video game) =

- NES box art
- Developers: Bethesda Softworks (NES); Brian A. Rice, Inc.(GEN, GG); Imagineering Inc. (GB, SNES); Probe Software (SMS); Manley & Associates (Amiga, DOS)
- Publishers: THQ (Nintendo platforms); Altron (Japanese releases for Nintendo platforms); Sega (GEN, GG, SMS); Capstone Software (Amiga, DOS)
- Directors: Ivan Manley (Amiga, DOS)
- Designers: Paul Coletta & Randy Linden (NES); Alex DeMeo & Barry Marx (GB, SNES); Dave Albert & Ivan Manley (Amiga, DOS)
- Programmers: Randy Linden & Paul Coletta (NES); Alex DeMeo, Garry Kitchen, David Lubar (SNES); David Lubar (GB); George Stults, John McKinnie, Jim McManus (Amiga, DOS)
- Artists: Nancy Freeman, Bob Hires (NES); Mike Sullivan (SNES, GB); Jonathan Sposato(Amiga, DOS)
- Composers: Rolf Weber & Cliff Falls (Genesis); George Sanger(NES); Mark Van Hecke(GB, SNES); Tom McMail(Amiga, DOS); Matt Furniss(Sega Master System)
- Series: Home Alone
- Platforms: Nintendo Entertainment System, Super Nintendo Entertainment System, Sega Genesis, Master System, Game Gear, Game Boy, Amiga, MS-DOS
- Release: NES: NA: October 1991; Super NES: NA: December 1991; PAL: January 1, 1992; JP: August 11, 1992; Game Boy: NA: November 1991; JP: June 26, 1992; Genesis/Game Gear: NA: December 1992; PAL: December 8, 1992; Amiga: EU: 1991; MS-DOS: NA: 1991; Master System: EU: June 7, 1993
- Genre: Action
- Mode: Single-player

Home Alone is the title of several tie-in video games based on the 1990 film of the same name written by John Hughes. Versions were released for the Nintendo Entertainment System, Game Boy, Super Nintendo Entertainment System, Master System, Sega Genesis, Game Gear, Amiga, and MS-DOS platforms. The games were released between 1991 and 1993, each with different gameplay.

== Plot and gameplay ==
There are multiple versions of the game and each features a different style of gameplay, but all share the same plot and roughly the same objective from the film: Kevin McCallister is left home alone when his family goes on Christmas vacation to Paris. He must prevent Harry and Marv, the "Wet Bandits", from burgling his home, using various household objects as traps and/or weapons.

== Versions ==
=== Super NES ===
In the Super NES version, the goal is to evade the Wet Bandits while bringing all of the McCallister's fortunes from the house down to the safe room in the basement. Once all items have been sent down the chute, Kevin must get past rats, bats, spiders, and ghosts he encounters in the basement, then fight a boss and head to the safe room to lock away the family's riches.

=== Personal computer ===
In the Home Alone game for the PC, the player is given from 8:00 to 9:00 (about five minutes of real time) to set up traps in order to hurt the Wet Bandits once they arrive. No further setting of traps is possible after this period. Each trap can only be triggered once and they all inflict a single point of damage.

Marv and Harry arrive separately at the two entrances to the house. If the player touches either Bandit, Kevin is caught and the game immediately ends in defeat. Hurting a Bandit ten times will permanently incapacitate him. The ultimate objective is to incapacitate both burglars.

The player can trigger their own traps, resulting in no harmful effects, but the trap will instantly disappear. If the player does not have enough remaining traps to sufficiently hurt each Bandit, the game will continue, but victory will be impossible. Following a game, the player may enter their names into a high score list. The position on the list is determined by whether the game was a win or a loss, by the time taken to defeat the Bandits, and by the total damage the player inflicted.

=== NES ===
In the NES version, the player must avoid being caught by Harry and Marv for 20 minutes. During this time, Kevin can set traps using items scattered around the house, each with a different corresponding strength and allowing the person tripping them to be knocked unconscious longer. Kevin can also hide behind certain parts of the house, but only for two consecutive turns; any other concurrent passings will result in a game over. Some copies of the NES version have two different "game over" screens; one having Kevin McCallister performing his trademark screaming face with a speech balloon on his left side that reads "Oh no!", the other one only having a large cloud with "Oh no!" in the middle of it.

=== Sega platforms ===
The Genesis and Game Gear versions feature a slightly different plot. While the games still revolve around Kevin's battle with the Wet Bandits, he instead must protect several houses in his neighborhood while waiting 20 minutes for the police to arrive (40 on higher difficulties). During the game, the Wet Bandits drive around the neighborhood in their undistinguished van until they decide to enter one of the houses. Kevin can travel by sled (in top-down view) to the various houses and fight the Bandits as they proceed to rob whichever house they are inside of (in a 2D platformer/side-scroller format). When this happens, Kevin must fight them off with different weapons and guns in order to fill up an empty Pain Meter. When the Pain Meter is full, that particular house will be saved, causing the Bandits to retreat. During this time, however, another meter will be filled as the Bandits proceed to rob the house, and if Kevin is unsuccessful in stopping them (thereby allowing meter to be filled), the house will become "flooded" (Marv leaves the water in robbed houses running as a calling card) and he will be unable to reenter the house again. If all the houses end up flooded, the game is over.

Kevin starts with a simple BB gun, but he may also find various items he can combine to craft makeshift weapons that have different effects depending on the ammunition (glue, snow, light bulbs, sound waves, coals, etc.) and gun type (rifle: flies the furthest and fastest; bazooka: flies slower and at a shorter distance; launcher: fires the weapon in a small, short arc; mortar: fires the weapon in a high, short arc.) Each gun has a specific amount of ammunition, but collecting other ammo items after the completion of certain guns will refill the ammo supply. The player may disassemble any of Kevin's weapons (aside from the BB gun) into its component pieces, so that other ammunition types may be utilized. Should Kevin enter a house before the Bandits, he can lay down several traps throughout the house (keeping with the game's movie tie-in theme) to help increase the Pain Meter and make protecting the house easier.

If any of the Bandits end up capturing Kevin, he will be strung up on a wall while they continue robbing the house, but he can fidget and drop down to continue defending the house. Each house also sports a unique defense that can work both for and against Kevin and the Wet Bandits while inside, such as Buzz's tarantula in the Mansion, a security robot in the Ultra Modern House, a ghost in the Colonial House, a cat in the Country House, and weak, collapsing floors in the Old House.

The game has two difficulty levels. In the hard difficulty, Kevin must wait 40 minutes for the police to arrive and the bandits’ van will drive faster from house to house, but Kevin will be able to create newer and more powerful guns to fight them off.

=== Master System ===
In the Master System version, Kevin walks through 30 levels in six different kinds of houses (including bonus levels) evading Harry and Marv and collecting a number of valuables (rings and pots) and putting them in a safe before the time runs out. Each house also feature a dog or a cat. Dogs attack the bandits and make them lose one of the valuables (when they have it) which also applies when Kevin comes in contact. Cats pull objects on the floor onto the level below. Kevin must prevent the bandits from walking away with any valuables or lose the game. He has a pump weapon (like in the movie) and can get ammo to shoot at enemies, causing them to drop one valuable (if they have any) and fall on to the floor for a few seconds.

In the bonus levels (one for each house) the Wet Bandits and pets are absent.

=== Game Boy ===
The Game Boy version, similar to the SNES and NES versions, requires the player to evade confrontation with the Wet Bandits. Similar to the SNES version, the player must gather up various items and then dump them into a laundry chute to deposit them into a safe. Sometimes, the player might resort to using the items the bandits planned to steal against them by dropping them onto their heads, as well as instigate certain traps as in the movie (e.g. dropping a paint can onto their heads). There are four levels in all, each taking place in a different area of the house, and each having a different item that the player must recover. The first level pertains to jewelry/gold/silver items, the second level has toys, the third level has various electronics, and the fourth level has exotic pets that are both rare and expensive.

After collecting the minimum amount of items and dumping them into the chute, the player can access the basement, where the level's boss must be defeated before the safe can be accessed. The boss of the first level is a giant spider, the second level a giant rat, the third level a giant ghost, and the fourth level is the battle against Marv and Harry (whose weaknesses are foreshadowed by their opening lines: a BB shot to the head and the murderer's snow shovel being used from the window, respectively). After securing the fourth safe, the player must eliminate the furnace (referring to a point in the movie where Kevin has to conquer his fear of the basement furnace). The game alludes to there being more members to the Wet Bandits than just Marv and Harry.

== Release ==
Bethesda Softworks' version of the game was released in 1991.

== Critical reception ==
Reception

Review scores
Publication	Score
Electronic Gaming Monthly	GB: 4/10, 5/10, 3/10, 5/10
GameZone	SNES: 62/100
Mega	SMD: 24%
MegaTech	SMD: 65%
Sega Master Force	SGG: 63% SMS: 61%

Amanda Dyson of Mega said the game was a wasted film license, and was a "grotesquely over-priced and pathetically under-developed mockery of a game". MegaTech said the game would only "appeal to junior players". Electronic Gaming Monthly gave the Game Boy version average to low reviews criticizing the gameplay as "slow and tedious", saying the game was lacking variety and had plain graphics.

Sega Master Force gave the Master System version praise for the graphics as "crisp and clear" and also praised the catchy game music, although there was criticism of the game levels: "For the first few levels, gameplay's dreadfully basic." They concluded, "Home Alone's a pretty jazzy cart when you get the hang of it. Not a bad effort."

The game sold about 50,000 units. Sega's version was a hit according to THQ.

== See also ==
- Home Alone 2: Lost in New York (video game)
