= Home Alone 3 =

1997 film by Raja Gosnell

- Theatrical release poster
- Directed by: Raja Gosnell
- Written by: John Hughes
- Produced by: John Hughes; Hilton Green
- Starring: Alex D. Linz
- Cinematography: Julio Macat
- Edited by: Bruce Green; Malcolm Campbell; David Rennie
- Music by: Nick Glennie-Smith
- Production companies: Fox Family Films; Hughes Entertainment
- Distributed by: 20th Century Fox
- Release date: December 12, 1997
- Running time: 102 minutes
- Country: United States
- Language: English
- Budget: $32 million
- Box office: $79.1 million

Home Alone 3 is a 1997 American crime comedy film directed by Raja Gosnell in his directorial debut and written and produced by John Hughes. It is the third installment in the Home Alone franchise and starred Alex D. Linz. The plot follows Alex Pruitt, an 8-year-old boy who defends his home from a dangerous group of international criminals working for a terrorist organization. Home Alone 3 was released on December 12, 1997, by 20th Century Fox. The film grossed $79.1 million against a $32 million budget and received negative reviews from critics due to lacking a reprising cast that represented the McCallister family of the two previous blockbuster Home Alone feature films. It was followed by a made-for-television sequel, Home Alone 4, in 2002.

== Plot ==
Internationally-wanted crime boss Peter Beaupre and his associates, Alice Ribbons, Burton Jernigan and Earl Unger, work for a Hong Kong-based terrorist organization linked to North Korea. In Silicon Valley, California, they steal a $10 million missile-cloaking microchip and hide it inside a radio-controlled car to get the chip past security at San Francisco International Airport. However, a passenger named Greta Hess inadvertently takes the criminals' bag containing the car, mistaking it for her identical bag. The criminals arrive in Chicago and systematically search every house in the suburban neighborhood to find the chip. 8-year-old Alex Pruitt is given the toy car as payment for shoveling her driveway. He returns home and discovers that he has chicken pox and must stay home from school. The next day, Alex discovers the criminals while spying on his neighbors and calls the police, but they dismiss them as a false flag as the criminals quickly escape out of sight. Alex attaches a camera to the car and uses it to spy on them, leading to the criminals chasing it when they see it. Wondering what they want with the toy car, Alex opens it and discovers the stolen chip. He calls the local U.S. Air Force Recruitment Center about the discovery and asks if they can forward the information about the chip to the authorities. The criminals realize that Alex has been watching them and decide to break into the Pruitt house, prompting Alex to rig his home with booby traps. The criminals break in, spring the traps and suffer various injuries. While the group pursue Alex around the house, he flees and rescues Greta, who has been taped to a chair in her garage by Alice. Peter ambushes Alex, but Alex uses a bubble gun resembling a Glock to scare him off. FBI agents and the police later arrive and arrest Alice, Burton and Earl, having received a tip from the recruitment center. However, Peter hides in a makeshift snow fort in the backyard. Stan's parrot discovers him and threatens to light fireworks, which are lined around the inside. Beaupre offers a cracker in exchange for silence, but the parrot demands two. Since Peter has only one, the parrot lights the fireworks, alerting the authorities to Peter's location. That evening, Greta, Alex's family and the authorities hold a celebration for Alex as the Pruitt house is being repaired, with Alex's father, Jack, returning home from a business trip. The company the chip was stolen from gives Alex a large monetary reward in gratitude. At the police department, the criminals are shown to have contracted Alex's chicken pox during their mugshots.

== Cast ==
- Alex D. Linz as Alex Pruitt, an 8-year-old boy
- Olek Krupa as Peter Beaupre, the leader of the international criminals
- Rya Kihlstedt as Alice Ribbons, the sole female of the international criminals and the group's second-in-command
- Lenny Von Dohlen as Burton Jernigan, one of the international criminals
- David Thornton as Earl Unger, one of the international criminals
- Haviland Morris as Karen Pruitt, Alex, Stan and Molly's mother
- Kevin Kilner as Jack Pruitt, Alex, Stan and Molly's father
- Marian Seldes as Mrs. Greta Hess, the Pruitts' elderly neighbor
- Seth Smith as Stan Pruitt, Alex's elder brother
- Scarlett Johansson as Molly Pruitt, Alex's elder sister
- Christopher Curry as Albert Stuckey, an FBI Special Agent who has been after Beaupre for seven years
- Baxter Harris as Police Captain Jackson
- Richard Hamilton as cab driver
- James Saito as Chou, the mob boss/unit leader of the terrorist organization
- Neil Flynn as a police officer
- Pat Healy as Agent Rogers, an FBI Agent working alongside Stuckey

== Production ==
Home Alone 3 was pitched at the same time as Home Alone 2: Lost in New York (1992) and both films were intended to be produced simultaneously, though those plans fell through. The idea for a third Home Alone movie was revived in the mid-1990s. Early drafts called for Macaulay Culkin to reprise the role of Kevin McCallister as a teenager. However, by 1994, Culkin had taken a hiatus from acting. As a result, the idea was reworked, centering on a new cast of characters. Kieran Culkin, Macaulay's younger brother who played Kevin's cousin Fuller in the first two films, was considered to replace him in his role as Kevin. However, the idea didn't pan out, apparently because Kieran doubted he could live up to the phenomenon Macaulay had been in the previous two films. It was filmed in Chicago and Evanston, Illinois, with the airport scenes at the beginning of the film being shot at two different concourses at O'Hare International Airport. Principal photography began on December 2, 1996 and filming concluded on March 22, 1997. Fox Family Films was the division of 20th Century Fox responsible for the production on the film. This division was unrelated to the Fox Family Channel, a cable network acquired by Fox and Saban Entertainment in June 1997, which was later sold to The Walt Disney Company in 2001, with Fox Family Channel becoming ABC Family that November and Freeform in January 2016.

== Music ==
Home Alone 3: Music from the Motion Picture

Soundtrack album by Various artists
- Released: December 12, 1997
- Length: 40:39
- Label: Hollywood

Home Alone chronology
Home Alone 2 (1992)	Home Alone 3 (1997)

Track listing
No.	Title	Artist(s)	Length
1.	"My Town"	Cartoon Boyfriend	3:18
2.	"All I Wanted Was a Skateboard"	Super Deluxe	2:34
3.	"I Want It All"	Dance Hall Crashers	3:19
4.	"Almost Grown"	Chuck Berry	2:20
5.	"School Day (Ring! Ring! Goes the Bell)"	Chuck Berry	2:42
6.	"Bad, Bad Leroy Brown" (version not in the film)	Jim Croce	3:01
7.	"Green-Eyed Lady" (version not in the film)	Sugarloaf	3:40
8.	"Let It Snow! Let It Snow! Let It Snow!"	Dean Martin	1:57
9.	"Home Again"	Oingo Boingo	5:26
10.	"Nite Prowler"	The Deuce Coupes	1:46
11.	"Tall Cool One"	The Wailers	2:35
12.	"Home Alone 3 Suite"	Nick Glennie-Smith	8:01

== Release ==
=== Theatrical ===
Home Alone 3 was released theatrically on December 12, 1997 by 20th Century Fox.

=== Home media ===
20th Century Fox Home Entertainment later released the film on VHS and LaserDisc in the United States on June 2, 1998. In 1998, it was also released on LaserDisc in Hong Kong and Japan and subsequently received a U.S. DVD release on November 3, 1998. It was one of Fox's earliest DVD releases; while the DVD presents the film in its original Widescreen format (1.85:1), it is presented in a non-anamorphic 4:3 matte. The U.S. DVD was later reissued in December 2007 (and also as part of Home Alone multi-packs, in 2006 and 2008). In Australia (Region 4), it was released on DVD in 2000 by 20th Century Fox Home Entertainment South Pacific, while it was released in the United Kingdom (Region 2).

=== Rights ===
In 2019, Rupert Murdoch sold most of 21st Century Fox's film and television assets to Disney, with Home Alone 3 and the rest of the films in the franchise being included in the deal. It was later made available to stream on Disney+.

== Reception ==
=== Box office ===
The film grossed $79.1 million worldwide against an estimated $32 million budget.

=== Critical response ===
On the review aggregator website Rotten Tomatoes, 36% of 25 critics' reviews are positive, with an average rating of 4.6/10. The website's consensus reads: "Macaulay Culkin's precocious charisma is sorely missed in this hollow sequel, which doubles down on the broad comedy while lacking all the hallmarks that made the original a classic." Audiences polled by CinemaScore gave the film an average grade of "B+" on an A+-F scale. Roger Ebert of the Chicago Sun-Times gave the film 3 out of 4 stars and said that he found it to be "fresh, very funny and better than the first two." Ebert also praised the film in his review on the December 13, 1997, episode of Siskel and Ebert, giving it a thumbs up. His colleague, Gene Siskel, gave the film a thumbs down and strongly disagreed with Ebert's positive assessment of the film, leading to a heated argument. At one point, Siskel questioned whether Ebert was "okay," with Ebert responding that he was "better than you were the day that you liked Starship Troopers," referring to Siskel's positive review of that film a month earlier. Clips of their Home Alone 3 review later became popular on the internet in the 2020s.

=== Accolades ===
Home Alone 3 was nominated for a Razzie for Worst Remake or Sequel at the 18th Golden Raspberry Awards, losing to Speed 2: Cruise Control (another Fox film).

== Sequel ==
Home Alone 4 was released as a made-for-television film that aired on ABC in 2002. It was the first film to not have any contributions from John Hughes.

== Novelization ==
A novelization based on the screenplay was written by Todd Strasser and published by Scholastic in 1997 to coincide with the film.
