= The Exegesis of Philip K. Dick =

2011 non-fiction book by science fiction writer Philip K. Dick from his 1974 journals

- Cover of the first edition
- Author: Philip K. Dick
- Language: English
- Subject: Philosophy, religion, science
- Publisher: Houghton Mifflin Harcourt
- Publication date: 2011
- Publication place: United States
- Media type: Print
- Pages: xxv, 944 pp.
- ISBN: 978-0-547-54927-9
- OCLC: 709669831

The Exegesis of Philip K. Dick is a 2011 non-fiction book containing the published selections of a journal kept by the science fiction writer Philip K. Dick, which he described as an exegesis and in which he documented and explored his religious and visionary experiences. Dick's wealth of knowledge on the subjects of philosophy, religion, and science inform the work throughout.

== Background to the journals ==
Dick started the journal after his visionary experiences in February and March 1974, which he called "2-3-74." These visions began shortly after Dick had two impacted wisdom teeth removed. When a delivery person from the pharmacy brought his pain medication, he noticed the ichthys necklace she wore and asked her what it meant. She responded that it was a symbol used by the early Christians, and in that moment Dick's religious experiences began:

In that instant, as I stared at the gleaming fish sign and heard her words, I suddenly experienced what I later learned is called anamnesis—a Greek word meaning, literally, "loss of forgetfulness." I remembered who I was and where I was. In an instant, in the twinkling of an eye, it all came back to me. And not only could I remember it but I could see it. The girl was a secret Christian and so was I. We lived in fear of detection by the Romans. We had to communicate with cryptic signs. She had just told me all this, and it was true.

For a short time, as hard as this is to believe or explain, I saw fading into view the black, prisonlike contours of hateful Rome. But, of much more importance, I remembered Jesus, who had just recently been with us, and had gone temporarily away, and would very soon return. My emotion was one of joy. We were secretly preparing to welcome Him back. It would not be long. And the Romans did not know. They thought He was dead, forever dead. That was our great secret, our joyous knowledge. Despite all appearances, Christ was going to return, and our delight and anticipation were boundless.

In the following weeks, Dick experienced further visions, including a hallucinatory slideshow of abstract patterns and an information-rich beam of pink light. In the Exegesis, he theorized as to the origins and meaning of these experiences, frequently concluding that they were religious in nature. The being that originated the experiences is referred to by several names, including Zebra, God, and the Vast Active Living Intelligence System. From 1974 until his death in 1982, Dick wrote the Exegesis by hand in late-night writing sessions, sometimes composing as many as 150 pages in a sitting. In total, it consists of approximately 8,000 pages of notes, only a small portion of which have been published.

A smaller selection of Dick's notes had been published in 1991 as In Pursuit of VALIS: Selections from the Exegesis. Besides the Exegesis, Dick described his visions and faith in numerous other works, including VALIS, Radio Free Albemuth, The Divine Invasion, The Transmigration of Timothy Archer, one brief passage in A Scanner Darkly, and the uncompleted The Owl in Daylight, as well as many essays and personal letters.

== Further volumes ==
Originally, in April 2010, Houghton Mifflin Harcourt had announced plans to publish extensive excerpts from the Exegesis in two volumes: the first, 1056 pages long, would have been released in 2011, and the second, of the same length, would have been released in 2012. Editor Jonathan Lethem said the upcoming publications would be "absolutely stultifying, brilliant, repetitive, and contradictory. It just might contain the secret of the universe." The plan was changed to publish the Exegesis as one large book; The Exegesis of Philip K. Dick was ultimately published November 2011.

== Bibliography ==
- Dick, Philip K. (2011). Jackson, Pamela; Lethem, Jonathan (eds.). The Exegesis of Philip K. Dick. Boston: Houghton Mifflin Harcourt. ISBN 978-0-547-54927-9.
