= If You Find This World Bad, You Should See Some of the Others =

1977 essay and speech by Philip K. Dick

"If You Find This World Bad, You Should See Some of the Others", also known as the "Metz speech", is a 1977 speech and essay by science fiction writer Philip K. Dick. He delivered it as the guest of honor on September 24, 1977, at the Second Metz International Science Fiction Festival in Metz, France. Dick prepared his first version of the speech by May of that year, but was asked to deliver a shorter version due to time constraints. The Metz speech, in its shorter form, was recorded on video and was translated to the French audience by an interpreter. Dick's speech lays out his characteristic, yet arcane thoughts on the philosophy of space and time and the concept of alternate universes within a hypothetical multiverse. The speech also discusses Dick's strange and unusual visions from 1974, his interpretation of Christian gnosticism, and the role of alternate history in his published work.

The speech was not well received. Dick spoke in a monotone voice, the interpreter's transcript differed from Dick's speech due to a last minute rewrite, and the audience was left confused and bewildered. At the time, nobody knew exactly what to make of the speech, as it defied conventional wisdom. Some accused Dick of being under the influence, which may have been true, or even of trying to start his own religion, which was a misunderstanding. Later, some critics argued that Dick had gone insane while writing Valis, which he talks about working on in the speech itself, but this conclusion was heavily debated with no clear resolution one way or the other. Dick himself admitted in the speech that what he was saying was neither provable nor rational. Several years later, he admitted that the speech "made no sense whatever". The speech was subsequently published in print form as an edited essay in French, English, German, and Italian, from 1978 to 1991. The audio portion was first broadcast on the radio in 1978, and again in 1982.

== Background ==
Biographer Paul Williams describes Dick as a "reluctant convention-goer", who would often cancel at the last minute due to illness when he was supposed to appear in public. Dick was living in the East Bay when the 22nd World Science Fiction Convention came to Oakland in 1964. He attended, giving rise to many rumors and legends about his life. Biographer Brian J. Robb notes that "Dick's reputation as a mad, drug-fueled SF prophet emerged almost fully formed from the 1964 WorldCon, and persisted beyond his death." Williams himself met Dick for the first time in Berkeley at the 26th World Science Fiction Convention in 1968. In correspondence with Andrew I. Porter, Dick spoke about having attended the 30th World Science Fiction Convention in Los Angeles in September 1972, expressing disappointment with his experience.

His home in Santa Venetia, near San Rafael, California, was burglarized in November 1971, leading him to temporarily leave the U.S. for Canada. (Note: Paul Williams investigated the 1971 home robbery on assignment for Rolling Stone in 1975. In the article, Williams explored five theories for the break-in in minute detail, going as far as verifying the police reports and talking with all of the major witnesses who confirmed the event.) With a recommendation from Ursula Le Guin, Dick attended the Vancouver Science Fiction Convention as the guest of honor from February 18–19, 1972, delivering the speech "The Android and the Human". Staying in Canada for an extended period, by March he was despondent and attempted suicide, which he survived, enrolling into a rehabilitation program for a month, and then returning to California. His experience at rehab in Canada later provided material for his novel A Scanner Darkly (1978). In 1974, Dick was asked to attend the West Coast Science Fantasy Conference as the guest of honor, but declined due to health issues. That same year, he was also asked to be the guest of honor for the future 35th World Science Fiction Convention in 1977, but also declined. In 1975, Dick was scheduled to give the speech "Man, Android and Machine" at the Institute of Contemporary Arts in London, but never made it due to illness. In his absence, it was published as an essay in Science Fiction at Large (1976).

By the summer of 1977, Dick was suffering from depression due to the lingering effects of his hallucinations from three years prior, the famous February–March 1974 vision, also known as "2-3-74". Dick struggled to adapt the strange experience into a novel, as he still had a Bantam contract to meet, which contributed to additional stress. Several years later, his book A Scanner Darkly was awarded the Graouilly d'Or for Best Novel at the Metz festival when it was published in France in 1979. Dick was invited to attend the International Festival of Science Fiction at Metz for a second time as guest of honor in June 1982, but he died unexpectedly from a stroke in March of that year at the age of 53. Up to that point, Dick had been writing for 30 years, having released 48 novels, more than 100 short stories, and several essays and speeches. At the time of his death, Dick was mostly unknown in the U.S. outside of niche academic and literature communities, but was widely read in Australia, Europe, and Japan.

== Invitation and preparation ==
The first Metz International Science Fiction Festival (Festival International de la Science-Fiction de Metz) took place from May 24–30, 1976, founded by Philippe Hupp, a book reviewer and French translator of Time Out of Joint (1959), as well as a columnist for the French version of Galaxy Science Fiction. Building on the momentum from the success of the first festival, Hupp invited Dick on February 23, 1977, to attend the second festival as the guest of honor. Dick accepted on March 17, and responded to Hupp with a brief description of his planned speech. (Note: "My speech on high-order mimicry would study the relationship between the imaginative aspects of science fiction and the use of actual scientific theory; which is to say, a study of the contrasts and the relatedness between what we normally call reality and the reality depicted in science fiction works. If I can get the speech together I think it will be a good one.") Even though Dick had accepted the invitation, his reputation for not showing up to conferences was well known. Hupp flew to the United States to make the case to Dick in person. They met for lunch at an Italian restaurant near his apartment in Santa Ana, California. Hupp sold him on the festival, explaining exactly how it would work and how Dick would be taken care of during his time in France. At the meeting, Dick gave Hupp an audio cassette of the speech he had already prepared (dated May 21), and they enjoyed a meal over two bottles of red wine. Hupp made note of the fact that Dick appeared to be happy. Acting also as photographer, Hupp captured several notable images of Dick after lunch, including one of him holding his cat and another where he is seen wearing a large, ornate crucifix. On June 27, Dick wrote a letter to Ralph Vicinanza, his New York literary agent, sending him a copy of his planned Metz speech, with the note, "I hope you enjoy the speech; I hope they do, too. Fortunately for me the French make no clear distinction between genius and madness."

== Metz International Science Fiction Festival ==
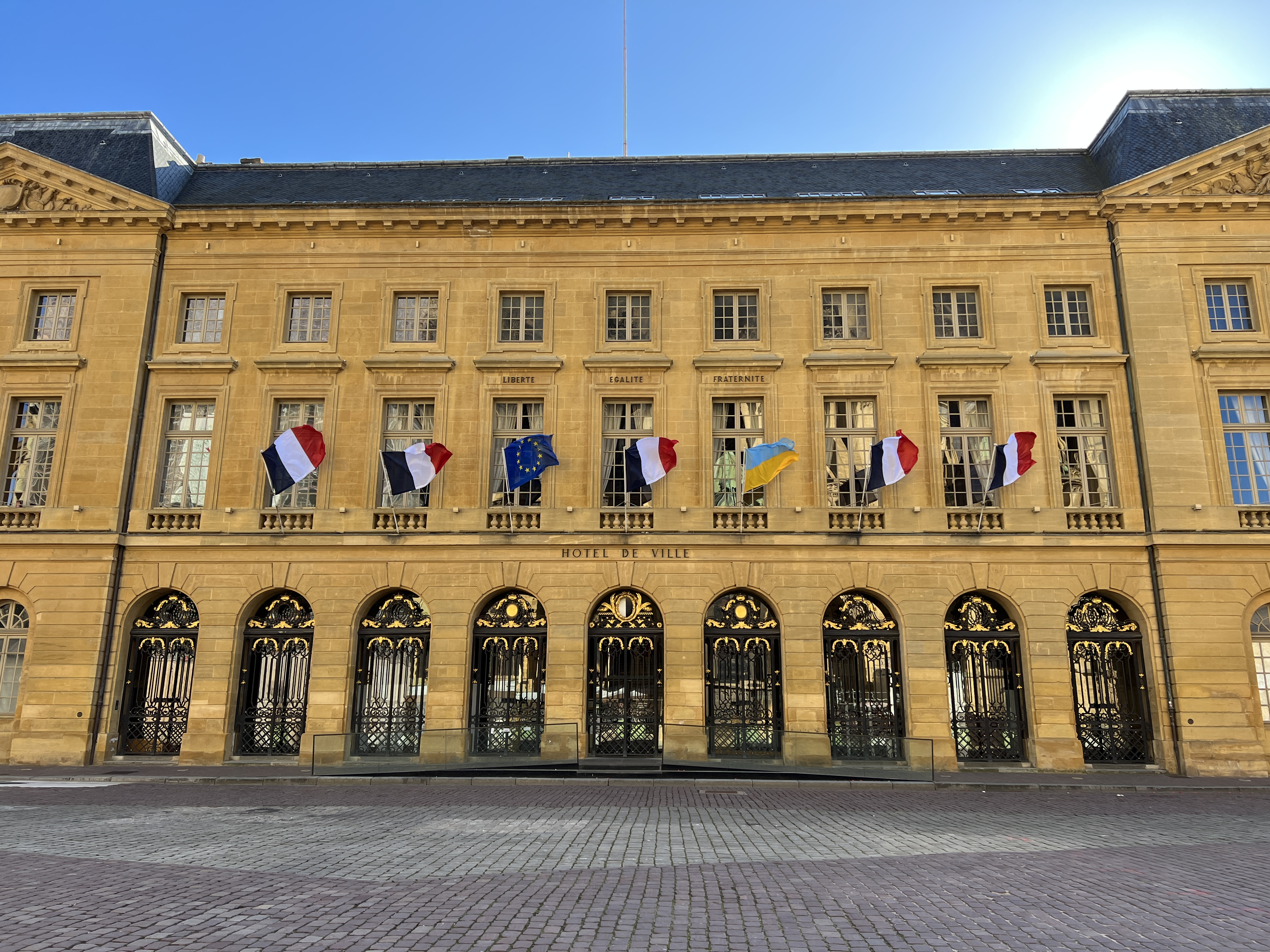
Dick gave the speech at city hall on the Place d'Armes, Metz, France

The second Metz festival took place on September 19–25, 1977. Dick and Joan Simpson (Note: In the summer of 1977, Dick was renting a house in Sonoma where he lived with Joan Simpson while also maintaining his apartment in Santa Ana. His short story, "The Day Mr. Computer Fell Out of Its Tree" (1977), features a fictionalized portrayal of their relationship. Dick's friends describe Simpson as a fan and a caregiver.) flew out to the festival together as a couple. It was one of only three times Dick had left the country. Before leaving for the trip, Dick acquired methamphetamine, one of the last known times he would use hard drugs. Hupp picked them up at the airport in Luxembourg and Dick and Simpson checked into the Sofitel hotel. Dick delivered his speech on September 24 at city hall on the Place d'Armes. The speech was titled "If You Find This World Bad, You Should See Some of the Others".

Writers Harlan Ellison, Roger Zelazny, John Brunner, Harry Harrison, Robert Sheckley, and Fritz Leiber were all in attendance at Metz. Also invited was film producer Gary Kurtz, who was promoting his film Star Wars (1977) in Europe. The film had just been released in May, and it was screened at the festival, although it was in English as the French version had not yet been made. Dick became a huge fan of the film and later claimed that George Lucas was drawing on the same ideas as he was. German musical duo Cluster, just coming off their Cluster & Eno sessions in June, performed live at Metz, with their performance memorialized in the 22-minute recording titled "Festival International de la Science-Fiction, Metz 1977" (2017). Dick remembered his experience in France fondly, describing the 1977 Metz festival as the greatest time of his life. "I think that there at Metz I was really happy for the first time", he recalled, believing that he had finally come home to his people.

== Synopsis ==
Dick proposes that novelists have a lot of ideas to work with, but most of these are meaningless and of no value. And yet, try as they might, over their entire career, a novelist may only come across a few great ideas. Dick argues that the novelist does not find or create these ideas on their own, rather these ideas are like living entities that seek out the novelist to make themselves manifest to the larger world, to history itself. To support this argument, Dick cites the pre-Socratic philosophers, who proposed the cosmos was a thinking entity, as well as theistic ideas found in works related to Indian Vedanta, Spinoza, and Alfred North Whitehead. Dick points to the existence of a hidden, gnostic, God-like figure, citing the Sufi poet Rumi to make his point: "The workman is invisible within the workshop". From this, Dick places these ideas within a continuum of multiple, parallel universes in a lateral axis of time, independent of linear progression, which he admits is absurd and nonsensical, and undermines his own belief in pantheistic monism. More importantly, Dick asks, what kind of changes would people experience if these realities were to be altered? Dick concludes that most people would not notice at all as their memories would adapt to the updated timelines.

Dick explains his original theory on "orthogonal or right-angle time". He presents ideas related to the philosophy of space and time and briefly proposes the existence of alternate universes as a thought experiment in relation to his own personal experiences and published works. Using the extended metaphor of the chessboard, and informed by ideas belonging to mythology (Note: Dick cites the idea of a "dark counterplayer" as belonging to Joseph Campbell, but Campbell expanded on the idea in mythological terms. The idea originally belonged to German ethnologist and archaeologist Leo Frobenius (1873–1938). Frobenius spoke of die unsichtbaren Gegenspieler, or "the invisible counterplayers", at work as hidden, unknown forces in cultural history.) and gnostic Christian theology, Dick describes how he believes that many worlds branch off due to a kind of chess game being played that alters the timeline of the "matrix world" by what he calls a "Programmer-Reprogrammer", a god-like entity who maintains an advantage playing against a "dark counterplayer", the personification of evil or death. Dick argues, by way of this metaphor, that the Programmer-Reprogrammer, or god, interferes with the timeline by changing the past to create a better future, and that some people (like himself) can perceive the relics and vestiges of the older timeline or alternate branches by various means, such as writing science fiction (which documents what these other worlds are like), feeling déjà vu, and even religious experience.

Dick explores the idea of alternate history in his own fiction, with works such as The Man in the High Castle, where the Axis powers won World War II instead of the Allies. He also connects this to Flow My Tears, the Policeman Said, his novel about a dystopian police state where people slip into more idealized, alternate worlds. Dick then ties this into Christian theology, arguing that it points to alternate realities itself: the faithful might see the alternate reality of the Kingdom of God, while those who don't will remain in their own alternate reality. Dick believes that Christ taught the method for traversing these alternate worlds, but that it had been lost, although it might be regained once again. To support his idea, Dick cites Isaiah 65, which speaks of the New Earth and the redemption of humanity: "For I am fashioning a new heaven and a new earth, and the memory of the former things will not enter the mind nor come up into the heart." Dick speculates that his fictional work forced people to remember the old timelines that a god-like entity had promised to delete with the creation of better timelines. "And perhaps in my novels and stories", Dick concludes, "I have done wrong to urge you to remember."

== Critical reception ==
Harlan Ellison did not attend Dick's speech, as they had been estranged since 1975 at the time. Ellison recalled that the people who heard the speech "looked like they had been stunned by a ball peen hammer...they thought [Dick] was either drunk or doped". John Brunner, who originally met Dick in 1964 at a party before Worldcon in Oakland, recalled his own confusion on the matter a decade later: "I...failed to figure out how literally [Dick] intended people to regard his claims", wrote Brunner. "I could not decide whether, after so many years of inner suffering, his reason had been usurped by his own inventions, or whether he had reached the bitter conclusion that the only way to cope with our lunatic world was to treat it as one vast and rather vicious joke, and fight back on the same irrational level."

Dick's friend Roger Zelazny, a co-author on the post-apocalyptic science fiction novel Deus Irae (1976), also recalled the confusion of the audience after the speech. At Metz, Zelazny encountered numerous fans engaged in heated arguments over the meaning of the speech. One person told Zelazny that he thought Dick intended to start a new religion with himself as the head of the church. Confused, Zelazny approached Dick to ask him what had happened. Dick explained that he wasn't sure, but he was asked to cut twenty minutes out of the speech, and that the cuts might have led to the French translator using a different version of the speech, contributing to the bewilderment of the audience. Zelazny found the situation comically apropos. "I suddenly felt as if I were in the middle of a Phil Dick story. (Note: See Charles Platt for a summary of what a PKD story is like: "Almost all of this work starts with the basic assumption that there cannot be one, single, objective reality. Everything is a matter of perception. The ground is liable to shift under your feet. A protagonist may find himself living out another person's dream, or he may enter a drug-induced state that actually makes better sense than the real world, or he may cross into a different universe completely. Cosmic Law is subject to sudden revision (by God, or whoever happens to be acting that role) and there are multiple truths." Zelazny's recollections in 1984 about Dick's reality distortion field was not new. Paul Williams had said the same thing years earlier in 1975: "There's something about ordinary reality that causes it to go all shimmery in the presence of Philip K. Dick.") He had been brought around the world to give a talk, it had been given and now everyone had a different view as to what had been said".

The question of Dick's state of mind was hotly debated, with people like Eric S. Rabkin arguing that Dick had gone insane after writing Valis, while Umberto Rossi argued against the idea. Dick notes in the speech, "I am aware that the claims I am making—claims of having retrieved buried memories of an alternate present and to have perceived the agency responsible for arranging that alteration—these claims can neither be proved nor can they even be made to sound rational in the usual sense of the word." Several years later, Dick commented on his Metz performance in the essay "The Lucky Dog Pet Store" (1979), which was edited and republished as a new "Introduction" to "The Golden Man" (1980). In the essay, he talks about how the Metz speech "typically, made no sense whatever". "Even the French couldn't understand it, despite a translation", Dick writes. "Something goes haywire in my brain when I write speeches; I think I imagine I'm a reincarnation of Zoroaster bringing news of God. So I try to make as few speeches as possible."

Philosopher Heath Massey believes that the speech addresses one of Dick's most "provocative" ideas about time, the suggestion that we live in many worlds, which Massey compares to the idea of possible worlds discussed in philosophy, as well as metaphysics and theology. Massey compares and contrasts Dick's use of the multiverse with the concept of eternal return, particularly the interpretation used by Friedrich Nietzsche. "Struggling against a world where ordinary people are dominated by impersonal, inhuman forces", writes Massey, "Dick proposes that not only are there many possible futures, but many alternate presents. Those who can imagine or perhaps even perceive them would, like those who affirm the eternal return, be virtually superhuman—not immortal, not omnipotent, but capable of resisting the supposedly inexorable march of time."

In his assessment of the audio-only portion of the speech broadcast on the radio, Richard Wolinsky remarked that Dick's monotonous voice made the speech difficult to understand.

== Release ==
Dick was interviewed several times during the conference. An interview conducted by Uwe Anton and Werner Fuchs was published three times in Germany, followed by its transcription and English publication in SF Eye in 1996. Another Metz interview by Yves Breux and François Luxereau appeared on the BBC in 1994 and on French cable television in 2002. To further commemorate Dick's participation at the conference in Metz, his short story "Explorers We" (1959) was reprinted in French as "Le retour des explorateurs" by Henry-Luc Planchât as a limited edition, 16 page booklet.

A year after Dick delivered his speech, it was published as an essay in French as "Si vous trouvez ce monde mauvais, vous devriez en voir quelques autres" in the work L'année 1977-1978 de la Science-Fiction et du Fantastique. It was later translated into German in 1986 and included in Kosmische Puppen und andere Lebensformen. The Philip K. Dick Society first published the essay in English in 1991, and it was later published in Italian in Se vi pare che questo mondo sia brutto in 1999. The essay was included in the anthology The Shifting Realities of Philip K. Dick by Pantheon Books in 1995, and later by Vintage Books.

The original speech delivered at Metz differs in many ways from the published essay, as some significant points raised (often in relation to a question and answer period) were not based on the initial essay, particularly Dick's comments about the simulation hypothesis, where he says "We are living in a computer-programmed reality, and the only clue we have to it is when some variable is changed, and some alteration in our reality occurs". (Note: This quote occurs at 17:16 in the edited version of the video hosted by CNRS. The original speech does not mention the simulation hypothesis but alludes to a reality programmed by a god-like entity.)

A second followup speech, "How To Build A Universe That Doesn't Fall Apart Two Days Later" (1978) was written a year later, but it is unlikely that it was ever delivered to an audience. It was first included in I Hope I Shall Arrive Soon (1985).

Berkeley Pacifica radio station KPFA was allegedly the first to publish, air, and popularize the audio of the Metz speech in 1978, followed by a re-broadcast in 1982.

== Notes and references ==
Notes
