= Californium (video game) =

2016 video game

- Developers: Darjeeling, Nova Productions
- Publisher: Arte
- Engine: Unity
- Platforms: Microsoft Windows, OS X
- Release: NA: 17 February 2016
- Genre: Adventure
- Mode: Single-player

Californium is an adventure game co-developed by Darjeeling and Nova Productions, and released in February 2016 for Microsoft Windows, OS X and Linux under Proton. Californium was developed as a tribute to science-fiction author Philip K. Dick on the 30th anniversary of his death. The player controls Elvin Green, a struggling writer dealing with family matters, as he discovers the means to manipulate reality, and explores several surreal landscapes.

== Gameplay ==
As an exploration game, the player can move Green around the current level, but has no direct means to interact with it. Several non-playable characters can be approached to initiate a one-side dialog with them. Through each level are several cathode-ray tube monitors that once discovered will present a Roman numeral value to the player. This represents the number of reality-warping points that must be found in the nearby area. These points are marked with a glowing Θ (Theta) glyph, but may require the player to look upon the point from a specific vantage point, to turn to look at the point from a specific direction, or to look near the point to eliminate objects in front of it to make it appear. When the glyph is hidden, objects nearby will flicker in and out of reality, allowing the player to recognize the glyph is nearby. Once the glyph is found, the player interacts with their controllers to activate it. This causes a spherical bubble of a new reality to replace what had previously been there. Once all the glyphs for a section are found, the player is given some narrative for the game, and other sections of the level may be made available. Once all sections are completed in the same manner, the player must then find the right vantage point on the level to enable a final large glyph that spans across many difference surfaces.

== Plot ==
Elvin Green is a struggling writer living in Berkeley, California in 1967. Following the death of his daughter Alice, and the departure of his wife Thea Trauberg, Green is struggling writer's block, unable to come up with new material for a book; his publisher threatens to drop him, he's in danger of being evicted from his apartment, and his drug addiction is escalating, manifesting in short seizures. Green suddenly hears a voice in his head coming from the static on his television, telling him to seek out images of the Theta. In finding these, Green is able to alter his reality and slip into a new one.

In this next reality, Green is revered as the Patriot Writer, the most important writer of his generation - however, California is now the California Republic, an authoritarian police state, and Green's wife Thea, an anti-state revolutionary has been captured and is planned to be executed; characters in this new reality, who are versions of their original selves, all suggest Green to collaborate with the state and bear witness against Thea. The voice, meanwhile, taunts Green that his success in this reality has come with a price, as Green explores and finds yet another reality.

In the third reality takes place on Mars, where Green is a Commander of a colony of cyborgs; Green was responsible for creating sentient androids, who eventually enslaved the remaining humanity as workforce. As he prepares for the opening of the museum in his name, colonists let Green know that his wife Thea, a human rebel, is planning to assassinate him at the museum's opening. Green's AI companion, Alice, in the meantime, encounters a technological anomaly, and becomes sentient, which terrifies her. The voice at this point begins to caution Green of exploring more realities, implying that venturing deeper may cause him to lose grip on his reality, but Green does so anyway.

The final reality Green finds is a scattered chaotic mash of the previous three realities; the voice at this point actively dissuades Green from venturing further, and there's a faint background sound of paramedics trying to revive a man - it is implied that Green is in fact encountering a drug-related emergency in the real world. Once Green reaches the top of the chaotic world and finds a giant Theta sigil, he appears in a dark void with a single desk and a typewriter. He then awakens in his original apartment and experiences another seizure, as he sits down in front of the static on the television again.

== Development ==
Californium was borne out of an idea between the development teams Darjeeling and Nova Productions in 2011 as the 30th anniversary of Dick's death was approaching. Darjeeling digital producer Noam Roubah noted that many of the themes that Dick had written about have since come to pass in the 21st century, such as the Internet and the dehumanization of human communications. The developers initially thought of doing a web-based project but within a few months opted to use a video game for this work. The teams brought artist Olivier Bonhomme to create surreal environments to reflect a more psychedelic feel, acknowledging the influence of recreational drugs in Dick's life, rather than the darker tones used in other adoptions of Dick's works. The developers took inspiration from Dick's earlier years in crafting Green; the departure of Green's wife and his dismissive editor are similar concepts Dick had to face early on.

The gameplay's central concept, of discovering the Theta glyph to change reality, was inspired by autobiographic material Dick wrote on coming to an epiphany in 1974 on seeing a woman wearing an ichthys symbol, which caused him to have a vision of a "pink beam" that would impart wisdom and insight to those it touched. The impact in the game comes from a speech by Dick, later published as an essay known as "If You Find This World Bad, You Should See Some of the Others". In the essay, Dick considers that many alternate realities are occurring simultaneously with the current one, and may come to see those though the subconscious. Journalists from Ars Technica and Motherboard have noted the game shares many similarities with Dick's 1981 VALIS, the first of a planned trilogy, which presents a story in which human behavior is controlled by an external intelligence.

The game was developed with financial support from the French broadcaster Arte, and was released to coincide with an Arte mini-series on the writer. Though the game was meant to be a tribute to Dick, the developers could not get appropriate rights from Dick's estate to use his name in any of the promotional materials for the title.

== Reception ==
Reception

Aggregate score
Aggregator	Score
Metacritic	64/100

Review score
Publication	Score
VideoGamer.com	6/10

Wired's Julie Muncy wrote that while California's mechanic of finding the hidden glyphs may become tedious, the game performed well as a "deep dive" in the ideas Philip K. Dick wrote about. Daniel Oberhaus for Motherboard similarly found the gameplay overly repetitive and felt because the developers could not attach Dick's name to the game, the game's connection to the author was weak, using only the more obscure biographical facts about Dick's life to make the association. Oberhaus though praised the game's visuals and attention to era-specific details. Martin Robinson of Eurogamer similarly found the details relating to Dick and his writings to be well done, but the central gameplay mechanic of finding the hidden glyphs become frustrating as there seemed to be no logic into how to reveal some of the glyphs. Rock Paper Shotgun's John Walker commented that the approach of showing the bubbles of alternate realities was "extraordinary as a piece of level design", while some of the attempts at meta-fictional narration had been better accomplished in The Stanley Parable.
