= Valis (novel series) =

Set of novels by Philip K. Dick

The VALIS trilogy is a set of science fiction/philosophical novels by author Philip K. Dick which include VALIS (1981), The Divine Invasion (1981), and The Transmigration of Timothy Archer (1982). Dick's first novel about the VALIS concept originally titled "VALISystem A" (written 1976), was published as Radio Free Albemuth after Dick's death (March 1982) in 1985.

== Background ==
In February and March 1974, Dick experienced a series of visions and other inexplicable perceptual and cognitive phenomena. For the rest of his life, Dick explored the philosophical implications and hypothesized about the origins of the experience, in a journal which eventually ran to hundreds of thousands of words. This work became known as the Exegesis, selections of which were published as The Exegesis of Philip K. Dick.

Dick's leading hypothesis was that he had been contacted by a transcendental, mystical mind he called VALIS (vast active living intelligence system).

In the summer of 1976, Dick completed a novel based on these so-called "2-3-74 experiences," which he titled VALISystem A. The novel was sold to Bantam Books, but after editor Mark Hurst suggested some possible revisions, Dick began contemplating a revision so radical as to constitute a new novel. The original VALISystem A was published posthumously as Radio Free Albemuth.

The new version, titled simply VALIS, was completed late in 1978 and published in 1981 (the plot of the earlier version appears as the plot of a science fiction movie, also called "VALIS," that the characters see). By that time, Dick had completed a second novel, one also filled with his thoughts about religion and philosophy and very indirectly linked to VALIS (the VALIS entity gets but two mentions), which he called VALIS Regained and which was published as The Divine Invasion.

Dick soon began talking (in letters and interviews) about a third novel to complete a "VALIS Trilogy." After Dick's death, several omnibus editions of the "VALIS Trilogy" were published, with his final mainstream novel The Transmigration of Timothy Archer. Timothy Archer does not cite VALIS, yet Dick himself called the three novels a trilogy, saying "the three do form a trilogy constellating around a basic theme."

- 1978 – VALIS
- 1980 – The Divine Invasion
- 1981 – The Transmigration of Timothy Archer
