= Radio Free Albemuth (film) =

2010 film directed by John Alan Simon

- Theatrical release poster
- Directed by: John Alan Simon
- Screenplay by: John Alan Simon
- Based on: Radio Free Albemuth by Philip K. Dick
- Produced by: Dale Rosenbloom; Stephen Nemeth; Elizabeth karr; John Alan Simon
- Starring: Jonathan Scarfe; Shea Whigham; Alanis Morissette; Katheryn Winnick; Scott Wilson
- Cinematography: Patrice Lucien Coche; Jon Felix
- Edited by: Phil Norden
- Music by: Robyn Hitchcock; Ralph Grierson
- Production companies: Open Pictures; Broadstroke Entertainment; Discovery Productions; Rhino Films
- Distributed by: Freestyle Releasing
- Release dates: February 25, 2010 (Sedona); June 27, 2014 (Limited/VOD)
- Running time: 110 minutes
- Country: United States
- Language: English
- Box office: $9,365

Radio Free Albemuth is a 2010 American film adaptation of the dystopian novel Radio Free Albemuth by author Philip K. Dick, which was written in 1976 and published posthumously in 1985. The film is written, directed, and produced by John Alan Simon and stars Jonathan Scarfe and Shea Whigham.

== Plot ==
In an alternate reality, circa 1985, the United States of America are under the authoritarian control of President Fremont.

Berkeley record store clerk Nick Brady lives modestly with his wife Rachel and their infant son. Nick has been experiencing strange visions and dreams. He confides in Rachel and his best friend, science-fiction writer Philip K. Dick. Nick calls the source of his visions VALIS (Vast Active Living Intelligence System).

One recurring symbol that he has been seeing is an ichthys. While he and Phil sit at a table, an orbiting satellite shoots a pink laser directly into Nick's head. He rushes his son to the ER, convinced that he has an inguinal hernia. The skeptical doctor is stunned to find that Nick is right. Nick has subsequent visions that tell him that he should relocate to Los Angeles, where he lands a job at a record label.

Philip is visited by two members of FAP (Friends of the American People). They press him for information about Nick's visions. The female FAP agent returns and sleeps with Philip. After their liaison, she pretends to be underage, hoping to coerce him into revealing what Nick is seeing from VALIS. Philip refuses to divulge anything about Nick.

Meanwhile, Nick has a dream where a woman is singing. During the dream, someone comments that there is something about her singing that seems subversive. Eventually, the woman turns up at Nick's record label, looking for a clerical job. She introduces herself as Sylvia, and Nick just assumes that she is a singer. Sylvia gradually reveals that she also receives visions from VALIS. She explains that there are several thousand people who receive transmissions from the orbiting satellite, and they are very loosely organized as a secret society.

The Russian government blows up the orbiting VALIS satellite, and Sylvia explains that it will take another 100 years for a replacement satellite to arrive. She writes a song with subliminal lyrics about VALIS. Nick forces The Fisher Kings to record the song, despite their total lack of interest in it. When they debut the song at a club, Nick explains to Philip how the subliminal messages are encoded in the recording.

FAP arrest Nick and Philip. They waste little time in executing Nick, as well as Sylvia. The film ends with Philip in prison, writing about Nick's VALIS experience. While he is working in a field one day, some teenagers gawk at the prisoners and laugh. Their boombox is playing Sylvia's subliminal song, and Philip realizes that the secret society found a way to get the song out, despite FAP's best efforts.

== Cast ==
- Jonathan Scarfe as Nick
- Shea Whigham as Phil
- Alanis Morissette as Sylvia
- Katheryn Winnick as Rachel Brady
- Hanna R. Hall as Vivian Kaplan
- Ashley Greene as Rhonda
- Mason Vale Cotton as Ezra
- Elizabeth Karr as Mrs. Brady
- Matt Letscher as Mr. Brady
- Rosemary Harris as Light Angel
- Jon Tenney as FBI agent
- Rich Sommer as FBI agent
- Joel McKinnon Miller as detective
- Scott Wilson as President Fremont

== Production ==
In February 2004, Utopia Pictures & Television acquired the rights to three novels by science fiction author Philip K. Dick, including the 1985 novel Radio Free Albemuth, considered to be a semi-autobiography of the author. Producer John Alan Simon was attached to produce film adaptations based on the novels, including Radio Free Albemuth. Simon became the writer and director for the film adaptation for Radio Free Albemuth, and filming began in October 2007 in and around Los Angeles.

Simon said that the film may be titled VALIS upon release. He explained, "The script is based at this point almost entirely on Radio Free Albemuth. The financiers like the title VALIS better - so that's the tentative title. Since Radio Free Albemuth is essentially the first draft of VALIS, we ended up with rights to both from the estate of Philip K. Dick." He further commented that "if Radio Free Albemuth is successful, VALIS the book would form the basis for the sequel to VALIS the movie. In other words, the story of VALIS would form the basis for VALIS 2."

== Release ==
The film screened as a work in-progress on February 27, 2010, at the Sedona International Film Festival. The world premiere was at the Gotham Screen International Film Festival in October 2010.

A trailer for the film was released on March 2, 2011.

The film was released in select cities (in addition to VOD) on June 27, 2014, by Freestyle Releasing.

== Reception ==
Rotten Tomatoes, a review aggregator, reports that 36% of 11 surveyed critics gave the film a positive review; the average rating is 4.4/10. Metacritic rated it 35/100 based on six reviews. Jeanette Catsoulis dismissed the film's "stiff staging and so-so special effects" in The New York Times before concluding, "The excellent Shea Whigham, as a science-fiction writer, is our guide and narrator, but even his gravitas won't keep you from laughing at an extraterrestrial who thinks that hiding subliminal messages in pop songs is the way to start a revolution." Richard Kuipers of Variety called it "an engrossing adaptation" that "operates successfully as a study of enlightenment and a straight-ahead conspiracy thriller". John DeFore of The Hollywood Reporter wrote, "Though it echoes A Scanner Darkly in a few pleasing ways, Albemuth is a substantially less satisfying affair, one whose longueurs and (deliberately?) cheesy effects work will alienate all but Dick's hardcore devotees." Gary Goldstein of the Los Angeles Times called it "a sluggish, often cheesy sci-fi thriller".

== See also ==
- List of adaptations of works by Philip K. Dick
