= Valis (novel) =

1981 novel by Philip K. Dick

VALIS
- Cover of first edition (paperback)
- Author: Philip K. Dick
- Language: English
- Series: VALIS trilogy
- Genre: Postmodern, philosophical, science fiction, autofiction
- Published: 1981 (Bantam Books)
- Publication place: United States
- Media type: Print (hardback & paperback)
- Pages: 271
- ISBN: 0-553-14156-2
- OCLC: 7066446
- LC Class: CPB Box no. 2502 vol. 18
- Followed by: The Divine Invasion

Valis (stylized as VALIS) is a 1981 science fiction novel by American writer Philip K. Dick, intended to be the first book of a three-part series. The title is an acronym for Vast Active Living Intelligence System, Dick's gnostic vision of God. Set in California during the 1970s, the book features heavy auto-biographical elements and draws inspiration from Dick's own investigations into his unexplained religious experiences over the previous decade.

It is the first book in the incomplete VALIS trilogy of novels, followed by The Divine Invasion (1981). The planned third novel, The Owl in Daylight, had not yet taken definite shape at the time of the author's death. Dick's final novel, The Transmigration of Timothy Archer (1982), builds on similar themes; Dick wrote: "the three do form a trilogy constellating around a basic theme."

== Synopsis ==
In March 1974, Horselover Fat (the alter-personality of Philip K. Dick) experiences visions of a pink beam of light that he calls Zebra and interprets as a theophany exposing hidden facts about the reality of our universe, and a group of others join him in researching these matters. One of their theories is that there is some kind of alien space probe in orbit around Earth, and that it is aiding them in their quest; it also aided the United States in disclosing the Watergate scandal and the resignation of Richard Nixon in August 1974.

Kevin turns his friends on to a film, Valis, that contains obvious references to revelations identical to those that Horselover Fat has experienced, including what appears to be time dysfunction. The film is itself a fictional account of an alternative-universe version of Nixon (Ferris F. Fremount) and his fall, engineered by a satellite called VALIS. (The plot of the fictitious film Valis was that of Dick's then-unpublished novel Radio Free Albemuth.)

In seeking the film's makers, Kevin, Phil, Fat, and David—now calling themselves the Rhipidon Society—head to an estate owned by popular musician Eric Lampton and his wife Linda. They decide the goal that they have been led toward is Sophia Lampton, who is two years old and the Messiah or incarnation of Holy Wisdom (Pistis Sophia) anticipated by some variants of Gnostic Christianity. In addition to healing Phil's schizophrenic personality split, she tells them that their conclusions about VALIS (which Fat had previously termed Zebra) and reality are correct, and more importantly, that we should worship, not gods, but humanity. She dies two days later due to a laser accident caused by Brent Mini.

Undeterred, Fat (who has now resurged) goes on a global search for the next incarnation of Sophia.

Dick also offers a rationalist explanation of his apparent theophany, acknowledging that it might have been visual and auditory hallucinations from either schizophrenia or drug addiction sequelae.

== Characters ==
- Phil (Philip K. Dick): Narrator (first person), science fiction writer, author of Man in the High Castle, Do Androids Dream of Electric Sheep?, and Three Stigmata.
- Horselover Fat: Narrator (third person), a schizophrenic modality of Phil himself. (Philip in Greek means "fond of horses"; dick is German for "fat".)
- Gloria Knudson: Suicidal friend of Fat's who Fat is unable to save.
- Kevin: Cynical friend of Fat's whose cat died running across the street, based on K. W. Jeter.
- Sherri Solvig: Church-going friend of Fat's, eventually dies from lymphatic cancer.
- David: Catholic friend of Fat's, based on Tim Powers.
- Eric Lampton: Rock star, screenwriter, actor, a. k. a. "Mother Goose"; a fictionalised version of David Bowie. Name derived from that of rock star Eric Clapton.
- Linda Lampton: Actress, wife of Eric Lampton.
- Brent Mini: Electronic composer, a fictionalised version of Brian Eno.
- Sophia Lampton: Two-year-old child (personalised incarnation of Holy Wisdom within some variants of Gnosticism), said to be the daughter of Linda Lampton and VALIS and the "Fifth Savior".

=== The Rhipidon Society ===
Phil, Fat, Kevin, and David decide to call themselves the Rhipidon Society. The motto they adopt is, "Fish cannot carry guns."

== Planned trilogy ==
Radio Free Albemuth, a posthumously published earlier version of VALIS, is not included as a component of the VALIS trilogy. Dick completed one more novel after The Divine Invasion, The Transmigration of Timothy Archer (1982), based on Dick's association with Bishop James A. Pike and which, while not referencing VALIS directly, is thematically similar. According to Dick, these three books "form a trilogy constellating around a basic theme".

== Reception ==
Greg Costikyan reviewed Valis in Ares Magazine #9 and commented that "The plot is minor, the characterization poor, and the prose unexciting; philosophy and deft manipulation of mood are not enough to carry the book."

Dave Langford reviewed Valis for White Dwarf #98, and stated that "Here a hard-headed Dick gently mocks the weird metaphysics of Fat through a series of wonderfully insane conversations and misadventures: a slapstick-tightrope-dance over a bit of potential insanity, a wrestle with demons in which (both inside and outside Valis) Dick is the unexpected winner."

Thomas M. Disch reported that "the fascination of the book, what's most artful and confounding about it, is the way the line between Dick and Fat shifts and wavers." Disch concludes that "as a novel, as a whole novel ... it went off the rails sometimes. But the first half holds together wonderfully, considering how much there is to be held together."

Umberto Rossi posits that some degree of academic discomfort towards the novel has resulted from uncertainty whether Dick genuinely believed in the more fantastical aspects of the narrative (further supported by the Exegesis which followed). In detailing the many ideological shunts between skepticism and belief which occur within the plot, Rossi concludes Dick intended neither view to achieve hegemony, but that the synthesis of both effectively depict "the unyielding contradictions in [Dick's] experience of self... Being involved in a quest does not automatically confer enlightenment, but rather involves a search for the light; the condition of the quester is one of doubt, not certainty."

== Dick's Exegesis ==
VALIS has been described as one node of an artificial satellite network originating from the star Sirius in the Canis Major constellation. According to Dick, the Earth satellite used "pink laser beams" to transfer information and project holograms on Earth and to facilitate communication between an extraterrestrial species and humanity. Dick claimed that VALIS used "disinhibiting stimuli" to communicate, using symbols to trigger recollection of intrinsic knowledge through the loss of amnesia, achieving gnosis. Drawing directly from Platonism and Gnosticism, Dick wrote in his Exegesis: "We appear to be memory coils (DNA carriers capable of experience) in a computer-like thinking system which, although we have correctly recorded and stored thousands of years of experiential information, and each of us possesses somewhat different deposits from all the other life forms, there is a malfunction—a failure—of memory retrieval."

At one point, Dick claimed to be in a state of enthousiasmos with VALIS, where he was informed his infant son was in danger of perishing from an unnamed malady. Routine checkups on the child had shown no trouble or illness; however, Dick insisted that thorough tests be run to ensure his son's health. The doctor eventually complied, despite the fact that there were no apparent symptoms. During the examination doctors discovered an inguinal hernia, which would have killed the child if an operation was not quickly performed. His son survived thanks to the operation, which Dick attributed to the "intervention" of VALIS.

Another event was an episode of supposed xenoglossia. Supposedly, Dick's wife transcribed the sounds she heard him speak, and discovered that he was speaking Koine Greek—the common Greek dialect during the Hellenistic years (3rd century BC–4th century AD) and direct "father" of today's modern Greek language—which he had never studied. As Dick was to later discover, Koine Greek was originally used to write the New Testament and the Septuagint. However, this was not the first time Dick had claimed xenoglossia: a decade earlier, Dick insisted he was able to think, speak, and read fluent Latin under the influence of Sandoz LSD-25.

The UK edition of VALIS also included "Cosmology and Cosmogony", a chapbook containing selections from Dick's Exegesis.

== Philosophical and cultural references ==
Theology and philosophy, especially metaphysical philosophy, play an important role in VALIS, presenting not just Dick's (and/or Horselover Fat's) own views on these subjects but also his interpretation of numerous religions and philosophies of the past. The most prominent religious references are to Valentinian Gnosticism, the Rose Cross Brotherhood, Zoroastrianism and Buddhism, as well as Biblical writings including the Book of Daniel and the New Testament epistles. Many ancient Greek philosophers are discussed, including several Pre-Socratics (Pythagoras, Xenophanes, Heraclitus, Empedocles, and Parmenides) as well as Plato and Aristotle. More recent thinkers that are mentioned include the philosophers Pascal and Schopenhauer, the Christian mystic Jakob Böhme, the alchemist Paracelsus, Carl Jung and Sigmund Freud, the Romanian historian of religion Mircea Eliade, and the author and psychologist Robert Anton Wilson. In Wilson's autobiographical Cosmic Trigger (released shortly before Dick commenced work on VALIS), Wilson describes similar musings concerning the 'Sirius Connection', contemplating the idea that alien entities are sending out waves of information that we can tune in on. VALIS specifically mentions the Dogon people, saying that they had encountered three-eyed people who had descended from Ikhnaton. References are also made to numerous deities, including Yurugu (who it associates with Yin) and Nommo (who it associates with Yang); it also suggests a blind, mad creator deity called Yaldaboath or Samael. The novel frequently references the 1945 discovery at Nag Hammadi.

The action of VALIS is set firmly in the American popular culture of its time, with references to the Grateful Dead, Frank Zappa, and Linda Ronstadt, as well as the fictional rock musicians Eric Lampton and Brent Mini (likely based on David Bowie and Brian Eno respectively). However, the novel also contains a number of high culture references such as the poets Vaughan, Wordsworth, and Goethe, and the classical composers Handel and Wagner. In particular, the novel contains several extended discussions about Wagner's metaphysical opera Parsifal.

=== Black Iron Prison ===
"The Black Iron Prison" is a concept of an all-pervasive system of social control postulated in the Tractates Cryptica Scriptura, a summary of an unpublished Gnostic exegesis included in VALIS. Dick wrote:

Once, in a cheap science fiction novel, Fat had come across a perfect description of the Black Iron Prison, but set in the far future. So if you superimposed the past (ancient Rome) over the present (California in the twentieth century) and superimposed the far future world of The Android Cried Me a River over that, you got the Empire, as the supra- or trans-temporal constant. Everyone who had ever lived was literally surrounded by the iron walls of the prison; they were all inside it and none of them knew it.

== In popular culture ==
VALIS was adapted in 1987 as an electronic opera by composer Tod Machover, and performed at Centre Georges Pompidou, with live singers and video installations created by artist Catherine Ikam.

On February 1, 2004, Variety announced that Utopia Pictures & Television had acquired the rights to three of Philip K. Dick's works: Flow My Tears, The Policeman Said, VALIS, and Radio Free Albemuth.

VALIS appeared in the TV show Lost. In the episode "Eggtown", aired February 21, 2008, the character John Locke gives Ben Linus the book to read from Ben's own book shelf, while Ben is being held captive. In "The Other Woman", aired March 6, 2008, Ben is again shown reading the novel before being interrupted by Locke.

John Alan Simon, director of the film adaptation of Radio Free Albemuth, remarked that VALIS will form the basis of a sequel to that film if it is successful: "Since Radio Free Albemuth is essentially the first draft of VALIS, we ended up with rights to both from the estate of Philip K. Dick. If Radio Free Albemuth is successful, VALIS the book would form the basis for the sequel to VALIS the movie. In other words, the story of VALIS would form the basis for VALIS 2."

British indie rock band Bloc Party has a song titled "V.A.L.I.S." on their 2012 album Four.

Progressive metal band Tacoma Narrows Bridge Disaster have songs named "Exegesis", "Valis" and "Black Iron Prison", all inspired by Dick's work, on their 2012 album Exegesis.

Portuguese double bassist Hugo Carvalhais's 3rd album Grand Valis (Clean Feed Records 2015) is inspired by Dick's book.

Grant Morrison used VALIS as a source of inspiration for The Invisibles, in particular for the Barbelith sentient satellite.

== See also ==
- Unreliable narrator
