= Isa Dick Hackett =

American producer and writer for Amazon (born 1967)

- Born: Isolde Freya Dick; March 15, 1967 (age 59); Greenbrae, California, U.S.
- Occupations: Producer; writer
- Father: Philip K. Dick

Isa Dick Hackett (born; Isolde Freya Dick; March 15, 1967) is an American producer and writer for Amazon who helped produce The Man in the High Castle, Philip K. Dick's Electric Dreams, and The Adjustment Bureau, all of which are based on works by her father, Philip K. Dick.

== Biography ==
Isa Dick Hackett was born Isolde Freya Dick in Greenbrae, California, to mother Nancy Hackett and father Philip K. Dick, the American science fiction writer. Hackett has helped write or produce several film adaptations of her father's works. Hackett oversees Electric Shepherd Productions with her siblings.

In the aftermath of revelations about sexual misconduct by Harvey Weinstein and the #MeToo movement in 2017, Hackett told The Hollywood Reporter that Roy Price, the programming chief at Amazon, had sexually harassed her at the 2015 San Diego Comic-Con. Price was not legally charged, but Amazon suspended him after an internal investigation and he later resigned.
