= Philip K. Dick =

American science fiction author (1928–1982)

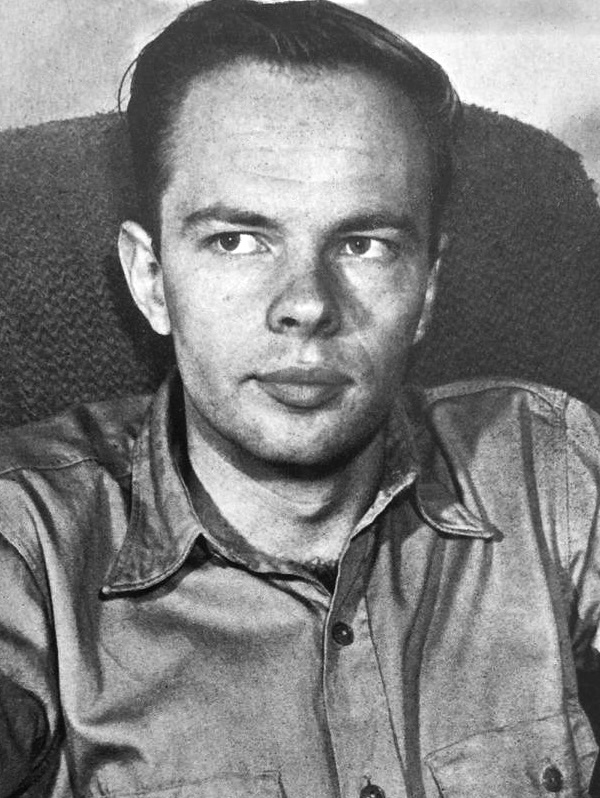
- Dick in the 1960s
- Born: Philip Kindred Dick; December 16, 1928; Chicago, Illinois, U.S.
- Died: March 2, 1982 (aged 53); Santa Ana, California, U.S.
- Occupations: Novelist, short story writer, essayist
- Spouses: Jeanette Marlin (m. 1948; div. 1948); Kleo Apostolides (m. 1950; div. 1959); Anne Williams Rubinstein (m. 1959; div. 1965); Nancy Hackett (m. 1966; div. 1972); Leslie "Tessa" Busby (m. 1973; div. 1977)
- Children: 3, including Isa
- Writing career
- Pen name: Richard Phillipps; Jack Dowland
- Period: 1950–1982
- Genres: Science fiction, Cyberpunk, paranoid fiction, philosophical fiction
- Notable works: Ubik; Do Androids Dream of Electric Sheep?; The Man in the High Castle; A Scanner Darkly; Flow My Tears, the Policeman Said; VALIS trilogy
- Movement: Postmodernism

Philip Kindred Dick (December 16, 1928 – March 2, 1982) was an American science fiction short story writer and novelist. He wrote 45 novels and about 121 short stories, most of which appeared in science fiction magazines. His fiction explored varied philosophical and social questions such as the nature of reality, perception, human nature, and identity, and commonly featured characters struggling against alternate realities, illusory environments, monopolistic corporations, drug abuse, authoritarian governments, and altered states of consciousness. He is considered one of the most important figures in 20th-century science fiction.

Born in Chicago, Dick moved to the San Francisco Bay Area with his family at a young age. He began publishing science fiction stories in 1952, at age 23. He found little commercial success until his alternative history novel The Man in the High Castle (1962) earned him acclaim, including a Hugo Award for Best Novel, when he was 33. He followed with science fiction novels such as Do Androids Dream of Electric Sheep? (1968) and Ubik (1969). His 1974 novel Flow My Tears, the Policeman Said won the John W. Campbell Memorial Award for Best Science Fiction Novel.

Following years of drug use and a series of mystical experiences in 1974, Dick's work engaged more explicitly with issues of theology, metaphysics, and the nature of reality, as in the novels A Scanner Darkly (1977), VALIS (1981), and The Transmigration of Timothy Archer (1982). A collection of his speculative nonfiction writing on these themes was published posthumously as The Exegesis of Philip K. Dick (2011). He died in 1982 at the age of 53 due to complications of a stroke. Following his death, he became "widely regarded as a master of imaginative, paranoid fiction in the vein of Franz Kafka and Thomas Pynchon".

Dick's posthumous influence has been widespread, extending beyond literary circles into Hollywood filmmaking. Popular films based on his works include Blade Runner (1982) and Blade Runner 2049 (2017), Total Recall (adapted twice: in 1990 and in 2012), Screamers (1995), Minority Report (2002), A Scanner Darkly (2006), The Adjustment Bureau (2011), and Radio Free Albemuth (2010). Beginning in 2015, Amazon Prime Video produced the multi-season television adaptation The Man in the High Castle, based on Dick's 1962 novel; and in 2017 Channel 4 produced the anthology series Electric Dreams, based on various Dick stories.

In 2005, Time magazine named Ubik (1969) one of the hundred greatest English-language novels published since 1923. In 2007, Dick became the first science fiction writer included in The Library of America series.

== Early life ==
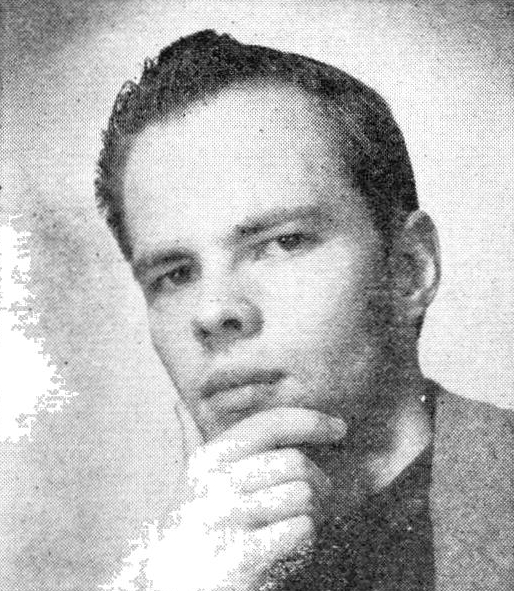
Philip K. Dick (c. 1953, age 24)

Philip Kindred Dick and his twin sister, Jane Charlotte Dick, were born six weeks prematurely on December 16, 1928, in Chicago, Illinois, to Dorothy (née Kindred; 1900–1978) and Joseph Edgar Dick (1899–1985), who worked for the United States Department of Agriculture. His paternal grandparents were Irish. Jane's death on January 26, six weeks after his birth, profoundly affected Philip's life, leading to the recurrent motif of the "phantom twin" in his books.

Dick's family later moved to the San Francisco Bay Area. When he was five, his father was transferred to Reno, Nevada, and when Dorothy refused to move, she and Joseph divorced. Both fought for custody of Philip, which was awarded to Dorothy. Determined to raise Philip alone, she took a job in Washington, D.C., and moved there with her son. Philip was enrolled at John Eaton Elementary School (1936–1938), completing the second through fourth grades. His lowest grade was a "C" in Written Composition, although a teacher said he "shows interest and ability in story telling". He was educated in Quaker schools. In June 1938, Dorothy and Philip returned to California, and it was around this time that he became interested in science fiction. Dick stated that he read his first science fiction magazine, Stirring Science Stories, in 1940.

Dick attended Berkeley High School in Berkeley, California. He and fellow science fiction author Ursula K. Le Guin were members of the class of 1947 but did not know each other at the time. He claimed to have hosted a classical music program on KSMO Radio in 1947. From 1948 to 1952, he worked at Art Music Company, a record store on Telegraph Avenue.

He attended the University of California, Berkeley, from September 1949 to November 11, 1949, ultimately receiving an honorable dismissal dated January 1, 1950. He did not declare a major and took classes in history, psychology, philosophy, and zoology. Dick dropped out because of ongoing anxiety problems, according to his third wife Anne's memoir. She also says he disliked the mandatory ROTC training. At Berkeley, he befriended poet Robert Duncan and poet and linguist Jack Spicer, who gave Dick ideas for a Martian language.

Through his studies in philosophy, he came to believe that existence is based on internal human perception, which does not necessarily correspond to external reality. He described himself as "an acosmic panentheist", which he explained as meaning that "I don't believe that the universe exists. I believe that the only thing that exists is God and he is more than the universe. The universe is an extension of God into space and time. That's the premise I start from in my work, that so-called 'reality' is a mass delusion that we've all been required to believe for reasons totally obscure". After reading the works of Plato and pondering the possibilities of metaphysical realms, he came to the conclusion that, in a certain sense, the world is not as real as the archetypal realm beyond it. Questioning reality thus became a theme in many of his novels.

== Career ==
=== Early writing ===
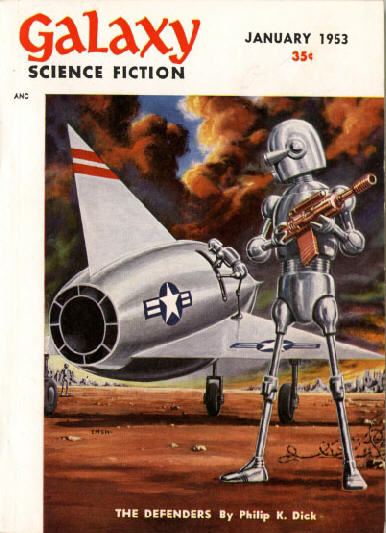
Dick's novelette "The Defenders" was the cover story for the January 1953 issue of Galaxy Science Fiction, illustrated by Ed Emshwiller.

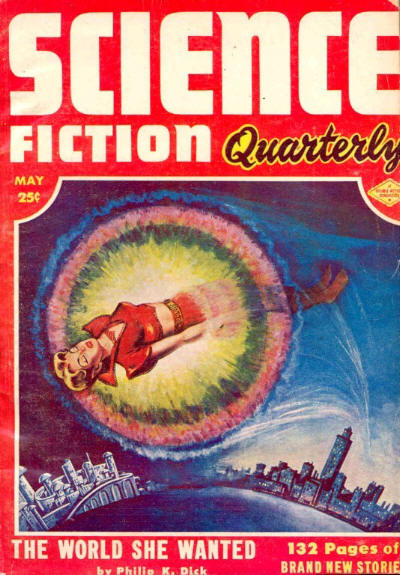
Dick's short story "The World She Wanted" took the cover of the May 1953 issue of Science Fiction Quarterly.

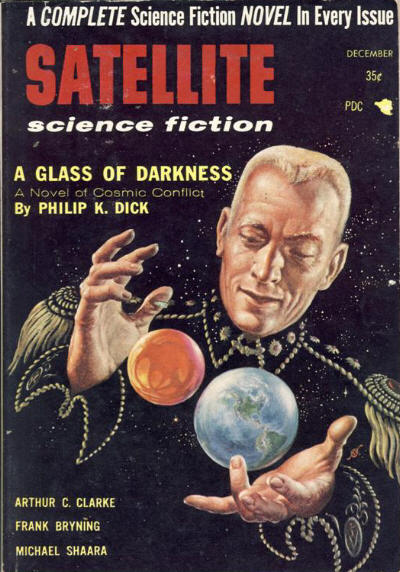
Dick's novel The Cosmic Puppets originally appeared in the December 1956 issue of Satellite Science Fiction as "A Glass of Darkness".

Dick sold his first story, "Roog"—about "a dog who imagined that the garbagemen who came every Friday morning were stealing valuable food which the family had carefully stored away in a safe metal container"—in 1951, when he was 22. From then on he wrote full-time. During 1952, his first speculative fiction publications appeared in July and September numbers of Planet Stories, edited by Jack O'Sullivan, and in If and The Magazine of Fantasy and Science Fiction (F&SF) that year. By 1953, F&SF described Dick as "one of the most prolific new professionals in the field", joking that "the editors of Whizzing Star Patrol and of the Quaint Quality Publication are in complete agreement upon Mr. Dick as a singularly satisfactory contributor". His debut novel, Solar Lottery, was published in 1955 as half of Ace Double #D-103 alongside The Big Jump by Leigh Brackett. The 1950s were a difficult and impoverished time for Dick, who once lamented, "We couldn't even pay the late fees on a library book." He published almost exclusively within the science fiction genre but dreamed of a career in mainstream fiction. During the 1950s, he produced a series of non-genre, relatively conventional novels.

In 1960, Dick wrote that he was willing to "take twenty to thirty years to succeed as a literary writer". The dream of mainstream success formally died in January 1963 when the Scott Meredith Literary Agency returned all of his unsold mainstream novels. Only one of them, Confessions of a Crap Artist, was published during Dick's lifetime, in 1975 by Paul Williams' Entwhistle Books.

In 1963, Dick won the Hugo Award for The Man in the High Castle. Although he was hailed as a genius in the science fiction world, the mainstream literary world was unappreciative, and he could publish books only through low-paying science fiction publishers such as Ace. He said in a 1977 interview that were it not for the interest of a French publishing company in the mid-1960s, which decided to publish all of his catalog to date, he would not have been able to continue as a writer. But even in his later years, he continued to have financial troubles. In the introduction to the 1980 short story collection, The Golden Man, he wrote:

"Several years ago, when I was ill, Heinlein offered his help, anything he could do, and we had never met; he would phone me to cheer me up and see how I was doing. He wanted to buy me an electric typewriter, God bless him—one of the few true gentlemen in this world. I don't agree with any ideas he puts forth in his writing, but that is neither here nor there. One time when I owed the IRS a lot of money and couldn't raise it, Heinlein loaned the money to me. I think a great deal of him and his wife; I dedicated a book to them in appreciation. Robert Heinlein is a fine-looking man, very impressive and very military in stance; you can tell he has a military background, even to the haircut. He knows I'm a flipped-out freak and still he helped me and my wife when we were in trouble. That is the best in humanity, there; that is who and what I love."

=== Flight to Canada, mental health and suicide attempt ===
In 1971, Dick's marriage to Nancy Hackett broke down, and she moved out of their house in Santa Venetia, California. He had abused amphetamine for much of the previous decade, stemming in part from his need to maintain a prolific writing regimen due to the financial exigencies of the science fiction field. He allowed other drug users to move into the house. Following the release of 21 novels between 1960 and 1970, these developments were exacerbated by unprecedented periods of writer's block, with Dick ultimately failing to publish new fiction until 1974.

One day, in November 1971, Dick returned to his home to discover it had been burgled, with his safe blown open and personal papers missing. The police could not determine the culprit, and even suspected Dick of having done it himself. Shortly thereafter, he was invited to be the guest of honor at the Vancouver Science Fiction Convention in February 1972. Within a day of arriving at the conference and giving his speech, The Android and the Human, he informed people that he had fallen in love with a woman named Janis whom he had met there and announced that he would be remaining in Vancouver. A conference attendee, Michael Walsh, movie critic for the local newspaper The Province, invited Dick to stay in his home, but asked him to leave two weeks later due to his erratic behavior. Janis then ended their relationship and moved away. On March 23, 1972, Dick attempted suicide by taking an overdose of the sedative potassium bromide. Subsequently, after deciding to seek help, Dick became a participant in X-Kalay (a Canadian Synanon-type recovery program), and was well enough by April to return to California. In October 1972, Dick wrote a letter to the FBI about science fiction writer Thomas Disch. Dick said he had been approached by a covert Anti-American organization which attempted to recruit him. Dick said he recognized their ideology in a book Disch wrote.

On relocating to Orange County, California at the behest of California State University, Fullerton professor Willis McNelly (who initiated a correspondence with Dick during his X-Kalay stint), he donated manuscripts, papers and other materials to the university's Special Collections Library, where they are in the Philip K. Dick Science Fiction Collection in the Pollak Library. During this period, Dick befriended a circle of Fullerton State students that included several aspiring science fiction writers, including K. W. Jeter, James Blaylock and Tim Powers. Jeter would later publish three novel sequels to Blade Runner.

Dick returned to the events of these months while writing his novel A Scanner Darkly (1977), which contains fictionalized depictions of the burglary of his home, his time using amphetamines and living with addicts, and his experiences of X-Kalay (portrayed in the novel as "New-Path"). A factual account of his recovery program participation was portrayed in his posthumously released book The Dark Haired Girl, a collection of letters and journals from the period.

=== Paranormal experiences ===
On February 20, 1974, while recovering from the effects of sodium pentothal administered for the extraction of an impacted wisdom tooth, Dick received a home delivery of Darvon from a young woman. When he opened the door, he was struck by the dark-haired girl's beauty, and was especially drawn to her golden necklace. He asked her about its curious fish-shaped design. As she was leaving, she replied: "This is a sign used by the early Christians." Dick called the symbol the "vesicle pisces". This name seems to have been based on his conflation of two related symbols, the Christian ichthys symbol (two intersecting arcs delineating a fish in profile), which the woman was wearing, and the vesica piscis.

Dick recounted that as the sun glinted off the gold pendant, the reflection caused the generation of a "pink beam" of light that mesmerized him. He came to believe the beam imparted wisdom and clairvoyance, and also believed it to be intelligent. On one occasion, he was startled by a separate recurrence of the pink beam, which imparted the information that his infant son was ill. The Dicks rushed the child to the hospital, where the illness was confirmed by professional diagnosis.

After the woman's departure, Dick began experiencing strange hallucinations. Although initially attributing them to side effects from medication, he considered this explanation implausible after weeks of continued hallucination. He told Charles Platt:

"I experienced an invasion of my mind by a transcendentally rational mind, as if I had been insane all my life and suddenly I had become sane."

Throughout February and March 1974, Dick experienced a series of hallucinations which he referred to as "2-3-74", shorthand for February–March 1974. Aside from the "pink beam", he described the initial hallucinations as geometric patterns, and, occasionally, brief pictures of Jesus and ancient Rome. As the hallucinations increased in duration and frequency, Dick claimed he began to live two parallel lives—one as himself, "Philip K. Dick", and one as "Thomas", a Christian persecuted by Romans in the first century AD. He referred to the "transcendentally rational mind" as "Zebra", "God" and "VALIS" (an acronym for Vast Active Living Intelligence System). He wrote about the experiences, first in the semi-autobiographical novel Radio Free Albemuth, then in VALIS, The Divine Invasion, The Transmigration of Timothy Archer and the unfinished The Owl in Daylight (the VALIS trilogy).

In 1974, Dick wrote a letter to the FBI, accusing various people, including University of California, San Diego professor Fredric Jameson, of being foreign agents of Warsaw Pact powers. He also wrote that Stanisław Lem was probably a false name used by a composite committee operating on orders of the Communist party to gain control over public opinion.

At one point, Dick felt he had been taken over by the spirit of the prophet Elijah. He believed that an episode in his novel Flow My Tears, the Policeman Said was a detailed retelling of a biblical story from the Book of Acts, which he had never read. He documented and discussed his experiences and faith in a private journal he called his "exegesis", portions of which were later published as The Exegesis of Philip K. Dick. The last novel he wrote was The Transmigration of Timothy Archer; it was published shortly after his death in 1982.

== Personal life ==
Dick was married five times:

- Jeanette Marlin (May to November 1948)
- Kleo Apostolides (June 14, 1950, to 1959)
- Anne Williams Rubinstein (April 1, 1959, to October 1965)
- Nancy Hackett (July 6, 1966, to 1972)
- Leslie "Tessa" Busby (April 18, 1973, to 1977)

Dick had three children, Laura Archer Dick (born February 25, 1960, to Dick and his third wife, Anne Williams Rubenstein), Isolde Freya Dick (now Isa Dick Hackett) (born March 15, 1967, to Dick and his fourth wife, Nancy Hackett), and Christopher Kenneth Dick (born July 25, 1973, to Dick and his fifth wife, Leslie "Tessa" Busby).

In 1955, Dick and his second wife, Kleo Apostolides, received a visit from the FBI, which they believed to be the result of Kleo's socialist views and left-wing activities.

He physically fought with Anne Williams Rubinstein, his third wife. Dick wrote to a friend that he and Anne had "dreadful violent fights...slamming each other around, smashing every object in the house." In 1963, Dick told his neighbors that his wife was attempting to kill him and had her involuntarily committed to a psychiatric institution for two weeks. After filing for divorce in 1964, Dick moved to Oakland to live with a fan, author and editor Grania Davis. Shortly after, he attempted suicide by driving off the road while she was a passenger.

=== Politics ===
Early in life, Dick attended Communist Party USA meetings but later shifted more towards anti-communism and libertarianism as time passed. In an interview, Dick once described himself as a "religious anarchist". Dick generally tried to stay out of the political scene because of high societal turmoil from the Vietnam War. Still, he showed some anti-Vietnam War and anti-governmental sentiments. In 1968, he joined the "Writers and Editors War Tax Protest", an anti-war pledge to pay no U.S. federal income tax, which resulted in the confiscation of his car by the IRS.

Dick was a critic of the U.S. federal government, regarding it to be just as "bad as the Soviet Union", and cheered on "a great decentralization of the government". Dick's politics occasionally influenced his literature. Dick's 1967 short story "Faith of Our Fathers" is critical of Communism. Dick's 1968 novel Do Androids Dream of Electric Sheep? condemns the eugenics movement. In 1974, as a response to the Roe v. Wade decision, Dick published "The Pre-persons", a satirical anti-abortion and anti-Malthusianism short story. Following the story's publication, Dick stated that he received death threats from feminists.

== Death ==
On February 17, 1982, after completing an interview, Dick contacted his therapist, complaining of failing eyesight, and was advised to go to a hospital immediately, but did not. The following day, he was found unconscious on the floor of his Santa Ana, California, home, having suffered a stroke. On February 25, 1982, Dick suffered another stroke in the hospital, which led to brain death. Five days later, on March 2, 1982, he was disconnected from life support.

After his death, Dick's father, Joseph, took his son's ashes to Riverside Cemetery in Fort Morgan, Colorado (section K, block 1, lot 56), where they were buried next to his twin sister Jane, who died in infancy. Her tombstone had been inscribed with both of their names at the time of her death, 53 years earlier. Philip died four months before the release of Blade Runner, the film based on his novel Do Androids Dream of Electric Sheep?

== Style and works ==
=== Themes ===
Dick's stories typically focus on the fragile nature of what is real and the construction of identity. His stories often become surreal fantasies, as the main characters slowly discover that their everyday world is actually an illusion assembled by powerful external entities, such as the suspended animation in Ubik, vast political conspiracies or the vicissitudes of an unreliable narrator. "All of his work starts with the basic assumption that there cannot be one, single, objective reality", writes science fiction author Charles Platt. "Everything is a matter of perception. The ground is liable to shift under your feet. A protagonist may find himself living out another person's dream, or he may enter a drug-induced state that actually makes better sense than the real world, or he may cross into a different universe completely."

Alternate universes and simulacra are common plot devices, with fictional worlds inhabited by common, working people, rather than galactic elites. "There are no heroes in Dick's books", Ursula K. Le Guin wrote, "but there are heroics. One is reminded of Dickens: what counts is the honesty, constancy, kindness and patience of ordinary people." Dick made no secret that much of his thinking and work was heavily influenced by the writings of Carl Jung. The Jungian constructs and models that most concerned Dick seem to be the archetypes of the collective unconscious, group projection/hallucination, synchronicity and personality theory. Many of Dick's protagonists overtly analyze reality and their perceptions in Jungian terms (see Lies, Inc.).

Dick identified one major theme of his work as the question, "What constitutes the authentic human being?" In works such as Do Androids Dream of Electric Sheep?, beings can appear totally human in every respect while lacking soul or compassion, while completely alien beings such as Glimmung in Galactic Pot-Healer may be more humane and complex than their human peers. Understood correctly, said Dick, the term "human being" applies "not to origin or to any ontology but to a way of being in the world." This authentic way of being manifests itself in compassion that recognizes the oneness of all life. "In Dick's vision, the moral imperative calls on us to care for all sentient beings, human or nonhuman, natural or artificial, regardless of their place in the order of things. And Dick makes clear that this imperative is grounded in empathy, not reason, whatever subsequent role reason may play." The figure of the android depicts those who are deficient in empathy, who are alienated from others and are becoming more mechanical (emotionless) in their behaviour. "In general, then, it can be said that for Dick robots represent machines that are becoming more like humans, while androids represent humans that are becoming more like machines."

Dick's third major theme is his fascination with war and his fear and hatred of it. One hardly sees critical mention of it, yet it is as integral to his body of work as oxygen is to water.

— Steven Owen Godersky

Mental illness was a constant interest of Dick's, and themes of mental illness permeate his work. The character Jack Bohlen in the 1964 novel Martian Time-Slip is an "ex-schizophrenic". The novel Clans of the Alphane Moon centers on an entire society made up of descendants of lunatic asylum inmates. In 1965, he wrote the essay titled "Schizophrenia and the Book of Changes".

Drug use (including religious, recreational, and abuse) was also a theme in many of Dick's works, such as A Scanner Darkly and The Three Stigmata of Palmer Eldritch. Dick himself was a drug user for much of his life. According to a 1975 interview in Rolling Stone, Dick wrote all of his books published before 1970 while on amphetamines. "A Scanner Darkly (1977) (Note: Completed, but not yet published, by the time of the November 1975 interview.) was the first complete novel I had written without speed", said Dick in the interview. He also experimented briefly with psychedelics, but wrote The Three Stigmata of Palmer Eldritch (1965), which Rolling Stone dubs "the classic LSD novel of all time", before he had ever tried them. Despite his heavy amphetamine use, however, Dick later said that doctors told him the amphetamines never actually affected him, that his liver had processed them before they reached his brain.

Summing up all these themes in Understanding Philip K. Dick, Eric Carl Link discussed eight themes or "ideas and motifs": Epistemology and the Nature of Reality, Know Thyself, The Android and the Human, Entropy and Pot Healing, The Theodicy Problem, Warfare and Power Politics, The Evolved Human, and "Technology, Media, Drugs and Madness".

=== Pen names ===
Dick had two professional stories published under the pen names Richard Phillipps and Jack Dowland. "Some Kinds of Life" was published in October 1953 in Fantastic Universe under byline Richard Phillipps, apparently because the magazine had a policy against publishing multiple stories by the same author in the same issue; "Planet for Transients" was published in the same issue under his own name.

The short story "Orpheus with Clay Feet" was published under the pen name Jack Dowland. The protagonist desires to be the muse for fictional author Jack Dowland, considered the greatest science fiction author of the 20th century. In the story, Dowland publishes a short story titled "Orpheus with Clay Feet" under the pen name Philip K. Dick.

The surname Dowland refers to Renaissance composer John Dowland, who is featured in several works. The title Flow My Tears, the Policeman Said directly refers to Dowland's best-known composition, "Flow, my tears". In the novel The Divine Invasion, the character Linda Fox, created specifically with Linda Ronstadt in mind, is an intergalactically famous singer whose entire body of work consists of recordings of John Dowland compositions.

=== Selected works ===
The Man in the High Castle (1962) is set in an alternative history in which the United States is ruled by the victorious Axis powers. It is the only Dick novel to win a Hugo Award. In 2015 this was adapted into a television series by Amazon Studios.

The Three Stigmata of Palmer Eldritch (1965) uses an array of science fiction concepts and features several layers of reality and unreality. It is also one of Dick's first works to explore religious themes. The novel takes place in the 21st century, when, under UN authority, mankind has colonized the Solar System's every habitable planet and moon. Life is physically daunting and psychologically monotonous for most colonists, so the UN must draft people to go to the colonies. Most entertain themselves using "Perky Pat" dolls and accessories manufactured by Earth-based "P.P. Layouts". The company also secretly creates "Can-D", an illegal but widely available hallucinogenic drug allowing the user to "translate" into Perky Pat (if the drug user is a woman) or Pat's boyfriend, Walt (if the drug user is a man). This recreational use of Can-D allows colonists to experience a few minutes of an idealized life on Earth by participating in a collective hallucination.

Do Androids Dream of Electric Sheep? (1968) is the story of a bounty hunter policing the local android population. It occurs on a dying, poisoned Earth de-populated of almost all animals and all "successful" humans; the only remaining inhabitants of the planet are people with no prospects off-world. The 1968 novel is the literary source of the film Blade Runner (1982).

Ubik (1969) employs extensive psychic telepathy and a suspended state after death in creating a state of eroding reality. A group of psychics is sent to investigate a rival organisation, but several of them are apparently killed by a saboteur's bomb. Much of the following novel flicks between different equally plausible realities and the "real" reality, a state of half-life and psychically manipulated realities. In 2005, Time magazine listed it among the "All-TIME 100 Greatest Novels" published since 1923.

Flow My Tears, the Policeman Said (1974) concerns Jason Taverner, a television star living in a dystopian near-future police state. After being attacked by an angry ex-girlfriend, Taverner awakens in a dingy Los Angeles hotel room. He still has his money in his wallet, but his identification cards are missing. This is no minor inconvenience, as security checkpoints (staffed by "pols" and "nats", the police and National Guard) are set up throughout the city to stop and arrest anyone without valid ID. Jason at first thinks that he was robbed, but soon discovers that his entire identity has been erased. There is no record of him in any official database, and even his closest associates do not recognize or remember him. For the first time in many years, Jason has no fame or reputation to rely on. He has only his innate charm and social graces to help him as he tries to find out what happened to his past while avoiding the attention of the pols. The novel was Dick's first published novel after years of silence, during which time his critical reputation had grown, and this novel was awarded the John W. Campbell Memorial Award for Best Science Fiction Novel. It is the only Philip K. Dick novel nominated for both a Hugo and a Nebula Award.

In an essay written two years before his death, Dick described how he learned from his Episcopal priest that an important scene in Flow My Tears, the Policeman Said – involving its other main character, the eponymous Police General Felix Buckman, was very similar to a scene in Acts of the Apostles, a book of the New Testament. Film director Richard Linklater discusses this novel in his film Waking Life, which begins with a scene reminiscent of another Dick novel, Time Out of Joint.

A Scanner Darkly (1977) is a bleak mixture of science fiction and police procedural novels; in its story, an undercover narcotics police detective begins to lose touch with reality after falling victim to Substance D, the same permanently mind-altering drug he was enlisted to help fight. Substance D is instantly addictive, beginning with a pleasant euphoria which is quickly replaced with increasing confusion, hallucinations and eventually total psychosis. In this novel, as with all Dick novels, there is an underlying thread of paranoia and dissociation with multiple realities perceived simultaneously. It was adapted to film by Richard Linklater.

The Philip K. Dick Reader is an introduction to the variety of Dick's short fiction.

VALIS (1980) is perhaps Dick's most postmodern and autobiographical novel, examining his own unexplained experiences. It may also be his most academically studied work, and was adapted as an opera by Tod Machover. Later works like the VALIS trilogy were heavily autobiographical, many with "two-three-seventy-four" (2–3–74) references and influences. The word VALIS is the acronym for Vast Active Living Intelligence System. Later, Dick theorized that VALIS was both a "reality generator" and a means of extraterrestrial communication. A fourth VALIS manuscript, Radio Free Albemuth, although composed in 1976, was posthumously published in 1985. This work is described by the publisher (Arbor House) as "an introduction and key to his magnificent VALIS trilogy".

Regardless of the feeling that he was somehow experiencing a divine communication, Dick was never fully able to rationalize the events. For the rest of his life, he struggled to comprehend what was occurring, questioning his own sanity and perception of reality. He transcribed what thoughts he could into an eight-thousand-page, one-million-word journal dubbed the Exegesis. From 1974 until his death in 1982, Dick spent many nights writing in this journal. A recurring theme in Exegesis is Dick's hypothesis that history had been stopped in the first century AD, and that "the Empire never ended". He saw Rome as the pinnacle of materialism and despotism, which, after forcing the Gnostics underground, had kept the population of Earth enslaved to worldly possessions. Dick believed that VALIS had communicated with him, and anonymously others, to induce the impeachment of U.S. President Richard Nixon, whom Dick believed to be the current Emperor of Rome incarnate.

In a 1968 essay titled "Self Portrait", collected in the 1995 book The Shifting Realities of Philip K. Dick, Dick reflects on his work and lists which books he feels "might escape World War Three": Eye in the Sky, The Man in the High Castle, Martian Time-Slip, Dr. Bloodmoney, or How We Got Along After the Bomb, The Zap Gun, The Penultimate Truth, The Simulacra, The Three Stigmata of Palmer Eldritch (which he refers to as "the most vital of them all"), Do Androids Dream of Electric Sheep?, and Ubik. In a 1976 interview, Dick cited A Scanner Darkly as his best work, feeling that he "had finally written a true masterpiece, after 25 years of writing".

=== Adaptations ===
==== Films ====
Several of Dick's stories have been made into films. Dick himself wrote a screenplay for an intended film adaptation of Ubik in 1974, but the film was never made. Many film adaptations have not used Dick's original titles. When asked why this was, Dick's ex-wife Tessa said, "Actually, the books rarely carry Phil's original titles, as the editors usually wrote new titles after reading his manuscripts. Phil often commented that he couldn't write good titles. If he could, he would have been an advertising writer instead of a novelist." Films based on Dick's writing had accumulated a total revenue of over US$1 billion by 2009.

- Blade Runner (1982), based on Dick's 1968 novel Do Androids Dream of Electric Sheep?, directed by Ridley Scott and starring Harrison Ford, Sean Young and Rutger Hauer. A screenplay had been in the works for years before Scott took the helm, with Dick being extremely critical of all versions. Dick was still apprehensive about how his story would be adapted for the film when the project was finally put into motion. Among other things, he refused to do a novelization of the film. But when Dick was given an opportunity to watch a few sequences portraying the film's imagined Los Angeles of 2019, he was amazed that the environment was "exactly as how I'd imagined it!"—even though Ridley Scott has mentioned he had never even read the source material. Following the screening, Dick and Scott had a frank but cordial discussion of Blade Runner's themes and characters, and although they had wildly differing views, Dick fully backed the film from then on, stating that his "life and creative work are justified and completed by Blade Runner". Dick died from a stroke less than four months before the release of the film. The 2017 film Blade Runner 2049 was a sequel to the 1982 movie.
- Total Recall (1990), based on the short story "We Can Remember It for You Wholesale", directed by Paul Verhoeven and starring Arnold Schwarzenegger.
- Confessions d'un Barjo (1992), titled Barjo in its English-language release, a French film based on the non-science-fiction novel Confessions of a Crap Artist.
- Screamers (1995), based on the short story "Second Variety", directed by Christian Duguay and starring Peter Weller. The location was altered from a war-devastated Earth to a distant planet. A sequel, titled Screamers: The Hunting, was released straight to DVD in 2009.
- Minority Report (2002), based on the short story "The Minority Report", directed by Steven Spielberg and starring Tom Cruise.
- Impostor (2001), based on the 1953 story "Impostor", directed by Gary Fleder and starring Gary Sinise, Vincent D'Onofrio and Madeleine Stowe. The story was also adapted in 1962 for the British television anthology series Out of This World.
- Paycheck (2003), directed by John Woo and starring Ben Affleck, based on Dick's short story of the same name.
- A Scanner Darkly (2006), directed by Richard Linklater and starring Keanu Reeves, Winona Ryder, and Robert Downey Jr., based on Dick's novel of the same name. The film was produced using the process of rotoscoping: it was first shot in live-action and then the live footage was animated over.
- Next (2007), directed by Lee Tamahori and starring Nicolas Cage, loosely based on the short story "The Golden Man".
- Radio Free Albemuth (2010), directed by John Alan Simon loosely based on the novel Radio Free Albemuth.
- The Adjustment Bureau (2011), directed by George Nolfi and starring Matt Damon, loosely based on the short story "Adjustment Team".
- Total Recall (2012), directed by Len Wiseman and starring Colin Farrell, second film adaptation of the short story "We Can Remember It for You Wholesale".

Future films based on Dick's writing include a film adaptation of Ubik which, according to Dick's daughter, Isa Dick Hackett, is in advanced negotiation. Ubik was set to be made into a film by Michel Gondry. In 2014, however, Gondry told French outlet Telerama (via Jeux Actu), that he was no longer working on the project. In November 2021, it was announced that Francis Lawrence will direct a film adaptation of Vulcan's Hammer, with Lawrence's about:blank production company, alongside New Republic Pictures and Electric Shepherd Productions, producing.

An animated adaptation of The King of the Elves from Walt Disney Animation Studios was in production and was set to be released in the spring of 2016 but it was cancelled following multiple creative problems.

The Terminator series prominently features the theme of humanoid assassination machines first portrayed in Second Variety. The Halcyon Company, known for developing the Terminator franchise, acquired right of first refusal to film adaptations of the works of Philip K. Dick in 2007. In May 2009, they announced plans for an adaptation of Flow My Tears, the Policeman Said.

==== Television ====
It was reported in 2010 that Ridley Scott would produce an adaptation of The Man in the High Castle for the BBC, in the form of a miniseries. A pilot episode was released on Amazon Prime Video in January 2015 and season 1 was fully released in ten episodes of about 60 minutes each on November 20, 2015. Premiering in January 2015, the pilot was Amazon's "most-watched since the original series development program began." The next month Amazon ordered episodes to fill out a ten-episode season, which was released in November, to positive reviews. A second season of ten episodes premiered in December 2016, and a third season was released on October 5, 2018. The fourth and final season premiered on November 15, 2019.

In late 2015, Fox aired Minority Report, a television series sequel adaptation to the 2002 film of the same name based on Dick's short story "The Minority Report" (1956). The show was cancelled after one 10-episode season.

In May 2016, it was announced that a 10-part anthology series was in the works. Titled Philip K. Dick's Electric Dreams, the series was distributed by Sony Pictures Television and premiered on Channel 4 in the United Kingdom and Amazon Prime Video in the United States. It was written by executive producers Ronald D. Moore and Michael Dinner, with executive input from Dick's daughter Isa Dick Hackett, and stars Bryan Cranston, also an executive producer.

==== Stage and radio ====
Four of Dick's works have been adapted for the stage.

One was the opera VALIS, composed and with libretto by Tod Machover, which premiered at the Pompidou Center in Paris on December 1, 1987, with a French libretto. It was subsequently revised and readapted into English, and was recorded and released on CD (Bridge Records BCD9007) in 1988.

Another was Flow My Tears, the Policeman Said, adapted by Linda Hartinian and produced by the New York-based avant-garde company Mabou Mines. It premiered in Boston at the Boston Shakespeare Theatre (June 18–30, 1985) and was subsequently staged in New York and Chicago. Productions of Flow My Tears, the Policeman Said were also staged by the Evidence Room in Los Angeles in 1999 and by the Fifth Column Theatre Company at the Oval House Theatre in London in the same year.

A play based on Radio Free Albemuth also had a brief run in the 1980s.

In November 2010, a production of Do Androids Dream of Electric Sheep?, adapted by Edward Einhorn, premiered at the 3LD Art and Technology Center in Manhattan.

A radio drama adaptation of Dick's short story "Mr. Spaceship" was aired by the Finnish Broadcasting Company (Yleisradio) in 1996 under the name Menolippu Paratiisiin. Radio dramatizations of Dick's short stories Colony and The Defenders were aired by NBC in 1956 as part of the series X Minus One.

In January 2006, a theatre adaptation of The Three Stigmata of Palmer Eldritch (English for Trzy stygmaty Palmera Eldritcha) premiered in Stary Teatr in Kraków, with an extensive use of lights and laser choreography.

In June 2014, the BBC broadcast a two-part adaptation of Do Androids Dream of Electric Sheep? on BBC Radio 4, starring James Purefoy as Rick Deckard.

==== Comics ====
Marvel Comics adapted Dick's short story "The Electric Ant" as a limited series which was released in 2009. The comic was produced by writer David Mack (Daredevil) and artist Pascal Alixe (Ultimate X-Men), with covers provided by artist Paul Pope. "The Electric Ant" had earlier been loosely adapted by Frank Miller and Geof Darrow in their 3-issue mini-series Hard Boiled published by Dark Horse Comics in 1990–1992.

In 2009, BOOM! Studios started publishing a 24-issue miniseries comic book adaptation of Do Androids Dream of Electric Sheep? Blade Runner, the 1982 film adapted from Do Androids Dream of Electric Sheep?, had previously been adapted to comics as A Marvel Comics Super Special: Blade Runner.

In 2011, Dynamite Entertainment published a four-issue miniseries Total Recall, a sequel to the 1990 film Total Recall, inspired by Philip K. Dick's short story "We Can Remember It for You Wholesale". In 1990, DC Comics published the official adaptation of the original film as a DC Movie Special: Total Recall.

"Philip K. Dick - A Comics Biography" gives an overview of the Authors Life. It illustrates how much his personal Struggles influenced his Novels and their respective Characters.

=== Alternative formats ===
In response to a 1975 request from the National Library for the Blind for permission to make use of The Man in the High Castle, Dick responded, "I also grant you a general permission to transcribe any of my former, present or future work, so indeed you can add my name to your 'general permission' list." Some of his books and stories are available in braille and other specialized formats through the NLS.

== Influence and legacy ==
Lawrence Sutin wrote a 1989 biography of Dick, titled Divine Invasions: A Life of Philip K. Dick.

In 1993, French writer Emmanuel Carrère published I Am Alive and You Are Dead: A Journey into the Mind of Philip K. Dick (French: Je suis vivant et vous êtes morts), which the author describes in his preface in this way:

The book you hold in your hands is a very peculiar book. I have tried to depict the life of Philip K. Dick from the inside, in other words, with the same freedom and empathy – indeed with the same truth – with which he depicted his own characters.

The book is novelistic, and it omits fact checking, sourcing, notes and index.

Dick has influenced many writers, including Jonathan Lethem and Ursula K. Le Guin. The prominent literary critic Fredric Jameson proclaimed Dick the "Shakespeare of Science Fiction", and praised his work as "one of the most powerful expressions of the society of spectacle and pseudo-event". The author Roberto Bolaño also praised Dick, describing him as "Thoreau plus the death of the American dream".

Dick has also influenced filmmakers, his work being compared to films such as the Wachowskis' The Matrix, David Cronenberg's Videodrome, eXistenZ, and Spider, Spike Jonze's Being John Malkovich, Adaptation, Michel Gondry's Eternal Sunshine of the Spotless Mind, Alex Proyas's Dark City, Peter Weir's The Truman Show, Andrew Niccol's Gattaca, In Time, Terry Gilliam's 12 Monkeys, David Fincher's Fight Club, Cameron Crowe's Vanilla Sky, Darren Aronofsky's Pi, Richard Kelly's Donnie Darko and Southland Tales, Rian Johnson's Looper, Duncan Jones' Source Code, Christopher Nolan's Memento and Inception, and Owen Dennis' Infinity Train.

His influence has also reached Filmmakers outside of the Hollywood establishment. Some Films that bear thematical semblance are: Alejandro Amenábar's Open Your Eyes, Jane Arden's Anti-Clock and Nikos Nikolaidis's Morning Patrol.

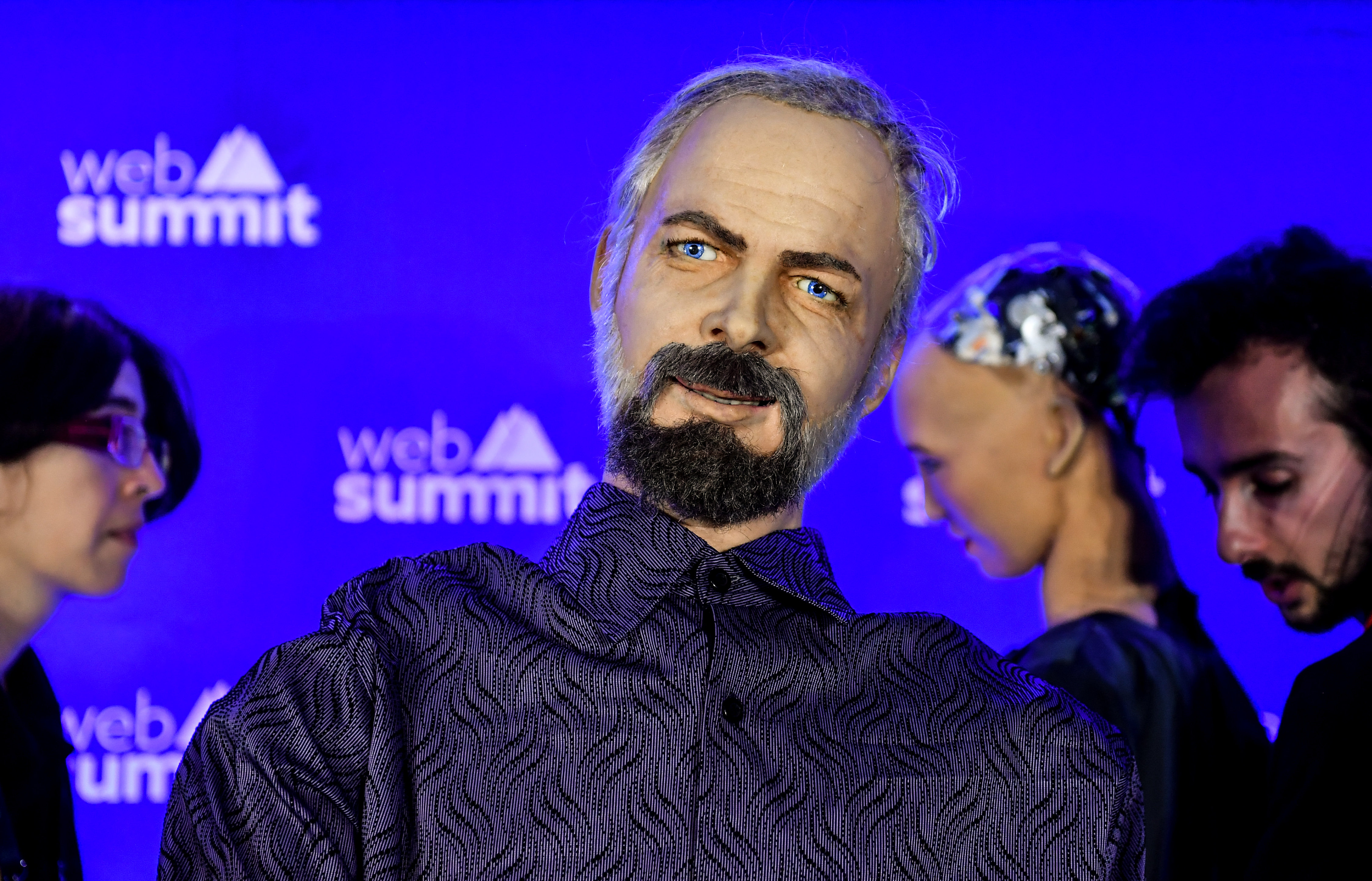
The Hanson Robotics Philip K. Dick Android, at the 2019 Web Summit event

The Philip K. Dick Society was an organization dedicated to promoting the literary works of Dick and was led by Dick's longtime friend and music journalist Paul Williams. Williams also served as Dick's literary executor for several years after Dick's death and wrote one of the first biographies of Dick, entitled Only Apparently Real: The World of Philip K. Dick.

The Philip K. Dick estate owns and operates the production company Electric Shepherd Productions, which has produced the film The Adjustment Bureau (2011), the TV series The Man in the High Castle and also a Marvel Comics 5-issue adaptation of Electric Ant.

Dick was recreated by his fans in the form of a simulacrum or remote-controlled android designed in his likeness. Such simulacra had been themes of many of Dick's works. The Philip K. Dick simulacrum was included on a discussion panel in a San Diego Comic Con presentation about the film adaptation of the novel, A Scanner Darkly. In February 2006, an America West Airlines employee misplaced the android's head, and it has not yet been found. In January 2011, it was announced that Hanson Robotics had built a replacement.

=== Film ===
- BBC2 released in 1994 a biographical documentary as part of its Arena arts series called Philip K. Dick: A Day in the Afterlife.
- The Gospel According to Philip K. Dick was a documentary film produced in 2001.
- The Penultimate Truth About Philip K. Dick was another biographical documentary film produced in 2007.
- The 1987 film The Trouble with Dick, in which Tom Villard plays a character named "Dick Kendred" (cf. Philip Kindred Dick), who is a science fiction author
- A 2008 film titled Your Name Here, by Matthew Wilder, features Bill Pullman as science fiction author William J. Frick, a character based on Dick
- The 2010 science fiction film 15 Till Midnight cites Dick's influence with an "acknowledgment to the works of" credit.

=== In fiction ===
- Michael Bishop's The Secret Ascension (1987; published as Philip K. Dick Is Dead, Alas), which is set in an alternative universe where his non-genre work is published but his science fiction is banned by a totalitarian United States in thrall to a demonically possessed Richard Nixon.
- The comics magazine Weirdo published "The Religious Experience of Philip K. Dick" by cartoonist Robert Crumb in 1986. Though this is not an adaptation of a specific book or story by Dick, it incorporates elements of Dick's experience which he related in short stories, novels, essays, and the Exegesis. The story parodies the form of a Chick tract, a type of evangelical comic, many of which relate the story of an epiphany leading to a conversion to fundamentalist Christianity.
- In the 1976 alternate history novel The Alteration by Kingsley Amis, one of the novels-within-a-novel depicted is The Man in the High Castle (mirroring The Grasshopper Lies Heavy in the real-life novel), still written by Philip K. Dick. Instead of the novel being set in 1962 in an alternate universe where the Axis Powers won the Second World War and named for Hawthorne Abendsen, the author of its novel-within-a-novel, it depicts an alternate universe where the Protestant Reformation occurred (events including the continuation of Henry VIII's Schismatic policies by his son, Henry IX, and the creation of an independent North America in 1848), with one character speculating that the titular character was a wizard.
- Ursula K. Le Guin called her 1971 novel The Lathe of Heaven "an homage to Philip K. Dick."

=== Music ===
- American rapper and producer El-P is a fan of Dick and other science fiction. Many of Dick's themes, such as paranoia and questions about the nature of reality, feature in El-P's work. A song on the 2002 album Fantastic Damage is titled "T.O.J." and the chorus makes reference to the Dick work Time Out of Joint.
- Sister, a Sonic Youth album, "was in part inspired by the life and works of science fiction writer Philip K. Dick".
- Blind Guardian's song "Time What is Time" from the 1992 album "Somewhere Far Beyond" is loosely based on the book "Do Androids Dream of Electric Sheep?".

=== Radio ===
- In June 2014, BBC Radio 4 broadcast The Two Georges by Stephen Keyworth, inspired by the FBI's investigation of Phil and his wife Kleo in 1955, and the subsequent friendship that developed between Phil and FBI Agent Scruggs.

=== Contemporary philosophy ===
Postmodernists such as Jean Baudrillard and Laurence Rickels have commented on Dick's writing's foreshadowing of postmodernity. Jean Baudrillard offers this interpretation:

"It is hyperreal. It is a universe of simulation, which is something altogether different. And this is so not because Dick speaks specifically of simulacra. SF has always done so, but it has always played upon the double, on artificial replication or imaginary duplication, whereas here the double has disappeared. There is no more double; one is always already in the other world, an other world which is not another, without mirrors or projection or utopias as means for reflection. The simulation is impassable, unsurpassable, checkmated, without exteriority. We can no longer move 'through the mirror' to the other side, as we could during the golden age of transcendence."

Dick's anti-government skepticism was referred to in Mythmakers and Lawbreakers, a collection of interviews about fiction by anarchist authors. Noting his early authorship of The Last of the Masters, an anarchist-themed novelette, author Margaret Killjoy expressed that while Dick never fully sided with anarchism, his opposition to government centralization and organized religion has influenced anarchist interpretations of gnosticism.

=== Video games ===
- The 3.0 update for the grand strategy video game Stellaris is named the "Dick" update, following the game's trend of naming updates after science fiction authors.
- The 2016 video game Californium was developed as a tribute to Philip K. Dick and his writings to coincide with an Arte's documentary series.

== Awards and honors ==
The Science Fiction Hall of Fame inducted Dick in 2005.

During his lifetime he received numerous annual literary awards and nominations for particular works.

- Hugo Awards
  - Best Novel
    - 1963 – winner: The Man in the High Castle
    - 1975 – nominee: Flow My Tears, the Policeman Said
  - Best Novelette
    - 1968 – nominee: Faith of Our Fathers
- Nebula Awards
  - Best Novel
    - 1965 – nominee: Dr. Bloodmoney
    - 1965 – nominee: The Three Stigmata of Palmer Eldritch
    - 1968 – nominee: Do Androids Dream of Electric Sheep?
    - 1974 – nominee: Flow My Tears, the Policeman Said
    - 1982 – nominee: The Transmigration of Timothy Archer
- John W. Campbell Memorial Award
  - Best Novel
    - 1975 – winner: Flow My Tears, the Policeman Said
- British Science Fiction Association Award
  - Best Novel
    - 1978 – winner: A Scanner Darkly
- Graoully d'Or (Festival de Metz, France)
  - 1979 – winner: A Scanner Darkly
- Kurd-Laßwitz-Preis
  - 1985 – winner VALIS

== Philip K. Dick Award ==
The Philip K. Dick Award is a science fiction award that annually recognizes the previous year's best SF paperback original published in the U.S. It is conferred at Norwescon, sponsored by the Philadelphia Science Fiction Society, and since 2005 supported by the Philip K. Dick Trust. Winning works are identified on their covers as Best Original SF Paperback. It is currently administered by John Silbersack and Gordon Van Gelder.

The award was inaugurated in 1983, the year after Dick's death. It was founded by Thomas Disch with assistance from David G. Hartwell, Paul S. Williams, and Charles N. Brown. Past administrators include Algis J. Budrys.

== See also ==
- Consensus reality
- Cyberpunk
- Paranoid fiction
- Transcendental idealism
