= The Three Stigmata of Palmer Eldritch =

1965 science fiction novel by Philip K. Dick

- First edition cover
- Author: Philip K. Dick
- Language: English
- Genre: Science fiction, dystopian fiction
- Publisher: Doubleday
- Publication date: 1965
- Publication place: United States
- Media type: Print (hardcover and paperback)
- Pages: 278

The Three Stigmata of Palmer Eldritch is a 1965 science fiction novel by American writer Philip K. Dick. Published by Doubleday, it was nominated for the Nebula Award for Best Novel.

Set largely among colonists on Mars, the novel depicts a society in which users of the hallucinogen Can-D inhabit the shared fantasy world of the Perky Pat layouts. Its plot turns on the return of Palmer Eldritch, a powerful industrialist who introduces the new drug Chew-Z, drawing Leo Bulero and Barney Mayerson into increasingly unstable levels of reality.

Critics have read the novel as a hallucinatory dystopia concerned with false or ersatz worlds, religion, evil, and the relation between metaphysics and capitalism. John Clute describes Palmer Eldritch as one of Dick's "God-substitutes", while Darko Suvin treats the book as a major work of Dick's central period in which political and ontological questions are equally at stake.

Contemporary reviews were mixed but often struck by the novel's ambition: Algis Budrys praised it highly, while Judith Merril and P. Schuyler Miller were more divided about its execution. Later critics and writers, including Michael Moorcock and China Miéville, continued to discuss it as a major Dick novel.

== Background and publication ==
Philip K. Dick later said that he wrote The Three Stigmata of Palmer Eldritch during a crisis in his religious beliefs and conceived it as a novel about "absolute evil" embodied in human form. He also recalled that the book disturbed him so much that he could not bear to reread the galleys. He later connected the novel to his reading on hallucinogens and noted that some critics had called it "the first LSD novel", while denying that his own drug experiences had been directly transposed into his fiction. The novel's background has also been linked to Dick's 1963 vision of "perfect evil" and to the Ken and Barbie dolls owned by his daughters, which fed into the Perky Pat material.

Dick's short story "The Days of Perky Pat", first published in the December 1963 issue of Amazing Stories, introduced the Perky Pat layouts and related material later incorporated into The Three Stigmata of Palmer Eldritch.

The novel was published by Doubleday in 1965 and was nominated for the Nebula Award for Best Novel. In 2007, it was reissued in the Library of America volume Philip K. Dick: Four Novels of the 1960s, edited by Jonathan Lethem.

== Plot ==
In the novel's 2016 setting, Earth has become increasingly uninhabitable, and many people are drafted or pressured into colonial settlements on Mars and elsewhere in the Solar System. Colonists endure harsh conditions by using the illegal drug Can-D together with elaborate Perky Pat doll layouts, which allow groups of users to share a fantasy of affluent life on Earth. The market for this escape is dominated by Leo Bulero, head of P. P. Layouts. His most valuable employee is Barney Mayerson, a precognitive consultant who predicts consumer trends. Although professionally successful, Barney is embittered and increasingly insecure. He lives with his assistant, Roni Fugate, fears replacement, and remains preoccupied with his former wife Emily, a ceramic artist whose work he rejects when it is offered to his company. His anxieties deepen when he is selected for possible colonial resettlement.

Bulero's business is threatened by the return of Palmer Eldritch, a merchant-explorer who has come back from the Prox system with a new hallucinogenic product called Chew-Z. Unlike Can-D, which depends on shared props and produces a communal illusion, Chew-Z offers a more private and seemingly unlimited experience. Bulero sees Eldritch as both a commercial rival and a personal menace. Guided by precognitive forecasts, he becomes convinced that he is destined to kill Eldritch and attempts to confront him. Instead, he is captured and forced into a Chew-Z experience. Within it, ordinary reality becomes unstable: apparent exits fail, time shifts, and Eldritch repeatedly appears, marked by his three stigmata of an artificial arm, artificial eyes, and steel teeth. Bulero is even shown what appears to be a future memorial crediting him with Eldritch's death, but he cannot tell whether what he sees is prophecy, deception, or another layer of hallucination.

After Bulero returns, or seems to return, he blames Barney for failing to rescue him and dismisses him, but later recruits him for a covert mission against Eldritch. Barney is sent to Mars with instructions to take Chew-Z and, at the height of the experience, ingest a second substance that will make the drug appear medically dangerous to regulators. On Mars he encounters the same emotional and spiritual desolation that drives colonists toward artificial escape. He meets Anne Hawthorne, a Christian missionary who opposes both Can-D and Chew-Z, and observes growing local interest in Eldritch's product. Eldritch begins to appear by projection or simulacrum, presenting Chew-Z as a superior form of transcendence. Barney delays carrying out his mission, working in a garden and attempting to recover a sense of ordinary reality, but eventually gives in and takes the drug.

Barney's experience with Chew-Z becomes a succession of shifting realities involving Emily, Roni, Bulero, and future versions of himself. He repeatedly seems to awaken, only to discover that the world he has entered is itself another layer of the drug. In one sequence he reaches a future in which Eldritch appears to be dead, only to learn that Chew-Z users may continue there as spectral presences. Eldritch confronts Barney directly, alternately explaining, threatening, and enticing him. Barney comes to believe that Eldritch is using Chew-Z not merely to sell hallucinations but to enter and dominate the realities of others. He also begins to suspect that Eldritch is attempting to replace him, so that the person Bulero is fated to kill as Palmer Eldritch may in fact be Barney.

Barney eventually reemerges on Mars, though neither he nor the narrative can firmly establish that he has returned to ordinary reality. Bulero and Felix Blau arrive expecting him to complete the sabotage plan by taking the second substance, but Barney refuses. He now believes that further use of Chew-Z would only deepen Eldritch's control. He also concludes that Eldritch may have been altered during his journey in deep space by an ancient, nonhuman force that now seeks to perpetuate itself through human beings by means of the drug. Barney discusses this possibility with Anne in religious terms.

The novel ends without a clear resolution. Bulero leaves Mars still intending to destroy Eldritch, and it is suggested that he either does so or will do so. At the same time, signs of Eldritch's three stigmata begin to appear more widely, even among people who may never have taken Chew-Z. Bulero himself starts to see Eldritch's marks in others and risks confusing himself with Eldritch. The closing chapters leave uncertain whether Bulero or Barney has truly escaped the drug, whether Eldritch is dead in any ordinary sense, or whether the boundary between consensual reality and Chew-Z reality has collapsed.

== Themes and analysis ==
Critics have repeatedly treated The Three Stigmata of Palmer Eldritch as one of Philip K. Dick's most sustained explorations of unstable reality. John Clute writes that the novel, "more extremely than any previous Dick book", occupies the zone where "the real and the ersatz interpenetrate", while Peter Fitting reads it as a key example of Dick's tendency to expose apparent reality as simulacrum or hallucination. Stanisław Lem likewise treats the novel as a hallucinatory world in which waking life and vision become indistinguishable, and Johan Svedjedal argues that Dick turns this instability into a formal problem of double realities, false exits, and repeated disorientation. In Lejla Kucukalic's reading, the Perky Pat layouts intensify this effect by offering not mere fantasy but manufactured verisimilitude, "believable dreams" that make artificial worlds feel more inhabitable than ordinary life.

This instability of reality is closely tied, in much criticism, to the novel's religious and metaphysical concerns. Dick later described the book as a novel about "absolute evil", and critics have often treated Palmer Eldritch as the figure through which that evil is embodied. Clute describes Eldritch as one of Dick's recurring "God-substitutes" and remarks that Chew-Z is presented in language recalling a communion wafer, though one that pre-empts rather than redeems reality. Lem similarly characterizes Eldritch as a source of "transcendental evil", while Anna Mojsiewicz reads him as a flawed, malevolent deity resembling the Gnostic Demiurge, master of a phantasmagorical universe in which illusion and reality can no longer be separated. Kucukalic likewise characterizes Eldritch as an anti-god or cosmic businessman who infiltrates objective reality, linking the novel's religious imagery to questions of possession, power, and corrupted transcendence.

Scholars have also emphasized that the novel's ontological instability is inseparable from its social and economic order. Darko Suvin argues that The Three Stigmata of Palmer Eldritch marks a crucial point in Dick's career because it is the first novel in which politics and ontology bear equal weight. David Golumbia similarly treats the book as a particularly strong example of Dick's fusion of metaphysical speculation with political reflection, arguing that its treatment of reality and appearance cannot be separated from questions of ideology and culture. In Suvin's account, Eldritch is not only a metaphysical threat but also a "mad capitalist", and the world around him is one of super-corporative capitalism, false religion, and entropic human relations. Adam Weiss extends that argument through a Nietzschean frame, reading the novel's hallucinogenic and technological systems as forms of dystopian domination in which progress, power, and altered perception become instruments of control rather than liberation.

Later criticism has often connected these concerns to the novel's treatment of agency and dehumanization. Svedjedal reads the book as an "ergodic nightmare" in which human beings are trapped in linked worlds and forced into choices whose consequences cannot be fully known in advance. In Mojsiewicz's reading, that pressure on choice is paired with a drama of dehumanization, as Eldritch's stigmata signify mutilation, possession, and the reduction of persons into replicas or collectivity. Suvin's contrast between Eldritch as destroyer and Emily as artist-creator similarly places pressure on what remains human in a world increasingly organized by profit, hallucination, and control. Taken together, these critics treat the novel not simply as a paranoid fantasy about drugged perception, but as a work concerned with whether authentic choice, creativity, and human distinctiveness can survive systems that turn experience itself into something manufactured and for sale.

== Reception ==
=== Contemporary reception ===
Contemporary response to The Three Stigmata of Palmer Eldritch was strong but divided. In Galaxy, Algis Budrys praised the novel as an "important, beautifully controlled, smoothly created book" and treated it as one of Dick's most distinctive achievements. In a later Galaxy column, Budrys went further, naming it the best science-fiction novel of his review year, while also noting that some readers had regarded it as a "half-conscious failure".

Other reviewers were more qualified in their praise. Writing in The Magazine of Fantasy & Science Fiction, Merril treated Dick as a writer of unusual imaginative force, but judged the novel less successful than The Man in the High Castle, praising its abundance of ideas while criticizing its structure, tonal instability, and lack of clarity. In Analog, Miller likewise found the book "wild, zany, and lively, but not very memorable", arguing that its increasingly tangled action left the reader uncertain even after finishing it. The novel was also nominated for the Nebula Award for Best Novel.

=== Retrospective criticism ===
Later criticism has generally treated the novel as one of Dick's major books, while often noting its formal instability and abrasive style. In an early scholarly assessment, Suvin called it a "flawed but powerful near-masterpiece" and treated it as a major work of Dick's central period. Lem likewise placed it among the main run of Dick's most important novels, reading it as a particularly forceful example of his hallucinatory and unstable fictional worlds.

Reviewing the novel decades later in The Guardian, Moorcock argued that it still posed "sturdy philosophical questions" despite what he saw as weak style and thin characterization. Miéville included it in his list of top ten works of weird fiction, using it as evidence of Dick's stature and describing its effect in terms of emotional and imaginative exhaustion. Taken together, later criticism has tended to value the novel less for polish than for its conceptual force, metaphysical pressure, and disorienting power.

== Legacy ==
Later critics and reference works have continued to place The Three Stigmata of Palmer Eldritch among Dick's major novels. In The Encyclopedia of Science Fiction, Clute groups it within Dick's "finest-achievement period" and treats it as one of the most intense examples of his recurring concern with the interpenetration of "the real and the ersatz". Kucukalic likewise situates the novel within the body of work through which Dick became, in her phrase, a "canonical writer of the digital age". Its later inclusion in the 2007 Library of America volume Philip K. Dick: Four Novels of the 1960s further marked its standing as one of the author's central works.

The novel has also remained visible in later cultural discussion beyond scholarship on Dick alone. Miéville included it in his list of top works of weird fiction, treating it as a touchstone of the genre's disorienting and reality-destabilizing effects. In The New Yorker, Adam Gopnik later invoked the novel in discussing The Matrix and the broader cultural appeal of simulated worlds and fake realities, using Dick's work as part of a broader discussion of modern anxieties about perception and artifice.

== See also ==
- Simulated reality
- Existenz (1999 film)
- Inception (2010 film)
