= The Transmigration of Timothy Archer =

1982 novel by Philip K. Dick

- Cover of first edition (hardcover)
- Author: Philip K. Dick
- Language: English
- Genre: Postmodern, philosophical
- Publisher: Timescape Books/Simon & Schuster
- Publication date: 1982
- Publication place: United States
- Media type: Print (Hardcover & Paperback)
- Pages: 255
- ISBN: 0-671-44066-7
- OCLC: 8051839
- Dewey Decimal: 813/.54 19
- LC Class: PS3554.I3 T7 1982

The Transmigration of Timothy Archer is a 1982 novel by American writer Philip K. Dick. As his final work, the book was published shortly after his death in March 1982, although it was written the previous year.

The novel draws on autobiographical details of Dick's friendship with the controversial Episcopal bishop James Pike, on whom the title character is loosely based. It continues Dick's investigation into the religious and philosophical themes of VALIS.

The novel was nominated for the Nebula Award for Best Novel in 1982.

== Development ==
The genesis of The Transmigration of Timothy Archer is closely tied to Philip K. Dick's decision to reject a highly lucrative opportunity in favor of a more personal literary project. During the production of Blade Runner, the film adaptation of Do Androids Dream of Electric Sheep?, Dick was offered the chance to write the official movie novelization. According to his own estimates, accepted by his literary agency, the project would have earned him approximately $400,000, a sum that would have effectively secured his financial future. The offer also included participation in merchandising revenues associated with the film.

By contrast, The Transmigration of Timothy Archer earned Dick an advance of only $7,500, which he described as close to the minimum payment for a mainstream literary novel by an author who was largely unknown outside the science-fiction field. Dick acknowledged that the financial disparity was enormous and admitted that he might ultimately discover he had sacrificed a fortune for a book that would fail commercially. Nevertheless, he considered the novel artistically indispensable and rejected what he characterized as a commercialized "cheapo" novelization aimed at a mass-market audience. He later remarked that although the Blade Runner project could have made him wealthy for life, he preferred to devote himself to what he regarded as the finest and most important book he was capable of writing.

== Plot ==
Set in the late 1960s and 1970s, the story describes the efforts of Episcopal bishop Timothy Archer, who must cope with the theological and philosophical implications of the newly discovered Gnostic Zadokite scroll fragments. The character of Bishop Archer is loosely based on the controversial, iconoclastic Episcopal bishop James Pike, who in 1969 died of exposure while exploring the Judean Desert near the Dead Sea in the West Bank.

As the novel opens, it is 1980. On the day that John Lennon is shot and killed, Angel Archer visits the houseboat of Edgar Barefoot, (a guru based on Alan Watts), and reflects on the lives of her deceased relatives. During the sixties, she was married to Jeff Archer, son of the Episcopal Bishop of California Timothy Archer. She introduced Kirsten Lundborg, a friend, to her father-in law, and the two began an affair. Kirsten has a son, Bill, from a previous relationship, who has schizophrenia, although he is knowledgeable as an automobile mechanic. Tim is already being investigated for his allegedly heretical views about the Holy Ghost.

Jeff commits suicide due to his romantic obsession with Kirsten. However, after poltergeist activity, he manifests to Tim and Kirsten at a seance, also attended by Angel. Angel is skeptical about the efficacy of astrology, and believes that the unfolding existential situation of Tim and Kirsten is akin to Friedrich Schiller's German Romanticism era masterpiece, the Wallenstein trilogy (insofar as their credulity reflects the loss of rational belief in contemporary consensual reality).

The three are told that Kirsten and Tim will die. As predicted, Kirsten loses her remission from cancer, and also commits suicide after a barbiturate overdose. Tim travels to Israel to investigate whether or not a psychotropic mushroom was associated with the resurrection, but his car stalls, he becomes disoriented, falls from a cliff, and dies in the desert.

On the houseboat, Angel is reunited with Bill, Kirsten's son who has schizophrenia. He claims to have Tim's reincarnated spirit within him, but is soon institutionalized. Angel agrees to care for Bill, in return for a rare record (Koto Music by Kimio Eto) that Edgar offers her.

The Transmigration of Timothy Archer is one of Dick's most overtly philosophical and intellectual works. While Dick's novels usually employ multiple narrators or an omniscient perspective, this story is told in the first person by a single narrator: Angel Archer, Bishop Archer's daughter-in-law.

== Characters ==
- Angel Archer: Narrator, manager of a Berkeley record store, widow of Jeff Archer.
- Timothy Archer: Bishop of California; father of the late Jeff Archer and father-in-law of Angel. Dies in Israel, searching for psychotropic mushroom connected with Zadokite sect. Based on James Albert Pike, Dick's personal friend, who was an American Episcopalian bishop.
- Kirsten Lundborg: Timothy Archer's secretary and lover. Dies from barbiturate overdose after loss of remission from cancer.
- Bill Lundborg: Kirsten's son who has schizophrenia, and who is obsessed with cars.
- Edgar Barefoot: Houseboat guru, radio personality, lecturer. Based on Alan Watts.
- Jeff Archer: Son of Timothy Archer, and deceased husband of Angel. A professional student who was romantically obsessed with Kirsten.

== Other works ==
The Transmigration of Timothy Archer is thematically related to Dick's unfinished VALIS trilogy of novels:

- VALIS (1981)
- The Divine Invasion (1981)

The novel has been included in several omnibus editions of the trilogy as a stand-in for the unwritten final volume. The Transmigration of Timothy Archer was not intended by Dick to be part of the trilogy; however, the book fits with the two finished volumes and Dick himself called the three novels a trilogy, saying "the three do form a trilogy constellating around a basic theme". Unlike its two predecessors in the VALIS trilogy, The Transmigration of Timothy Archer contains almost no science-fiction elements. Dick consciously abandoned futuristic settings and speculative technology in favor of contemporary realism. The narrative begins shortly after the assassination of John Lennon and unfolds through memories, conversations, and reflections on loss and faith. For Dick, this shift represented a return to mainstream literary fiction after more than twenty years devoted primarily to science fiction.

The book was originally titled Bishop Timothy Archer.

== Criticism ==
- Frasca, Gabriele, “Come rimanere rimasti: La trasmigrazione di Timothy Archer”, Trasmigrazioni: I mondi di Philip K. Dick, eds. De Angelis and Rossi, Firenze, Le Monnier, 2006, pp. 237–60.
- Zaleski, Philip (August 10, 1982). "Getting metaphysical: The transcendental world of Philip Kendred Dick". The Boston Phoenix.

== See also ==
- Radio Free Albemuth
