= Time Out of Joint =

1959 novel by Philip K. Dick

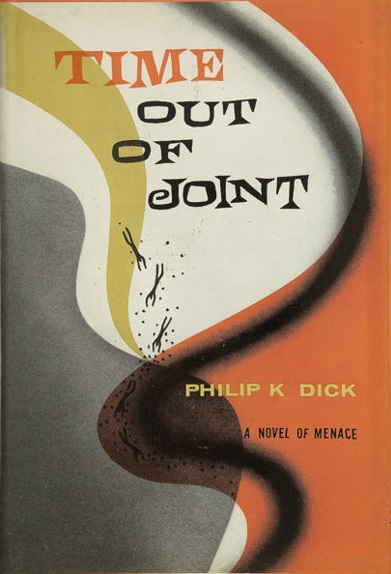
- Cover of first edition (hardcover)
- Author: Philip K. Dick
- Cover artist: Arthur Hawkins
- Language: English
- Genre: Science fiction
- Publisher: J. B. Lippincott Company
- Publication date: 1959
- Publication place: United States
- Media type: Print (hardback & paperback)
- Pages: 221

Time Out of Joint is a science fiction novel by American writer Philip K. Dick, first published in novel form in the United States in 1959. An abridged version was also serialised in the British science fiction magazine New Worlds Science Fiction in several installments from December 1959 to February 1960.

The novel epitomizes many of Dick's themes with its concerns about the nature of reality and ordinary people in ordinary lives having the world unravel around them. The title is a reference to Shakespeare's play Hamlet. The line is uttered by Hamlet after being visited by his father's ghost and learning that his uncle Claudius murdered his father; in short, a shocking supernatural event that fundamentally alters the way Hamlet perceives the state and the universe ("The time is out of joint; O cursed spite!/That ever I was born to set it right!" [I.V.211-2]), much as do several events in the novel.

== Plot summary ==
Cover of 1977 Belmont paperback edition

Ragle Gumm lives in the year 1959 in a quiet American town. His unusual profession consists of repeatedly winning the cash prize in a national newspaper contest called "Where Will The Little Green Man Be Next?". Gumm's 1959 has some differences from ours: the Tucker car is in production, AM/FM radios are scarce to non-existent, and Marilyn Monroe is a complete unknown. As the novel opens, strange things begin to happen to Gumm. A soft-drink stand disappears, replaced by a small slip of paper with the words "SOFT-DRINK STAND" printed on it in block letters. Intriguing little pieces of the real 1959 turn up: a magazine article on Marilyn Monroe, a telephone book with non-operational exchanges listed and radios hidden away in someone else's house. People with no apparent connection to Gumm, including military pilots using aircraft transceivers, refer to him by name. Few other characters notice these or experience similar anomalies; the sole exception is Gumm's supposed brother-in-law, Victor "Vic" Nielson, in whom he confides. A neighborhood woman, Mrs. Keitelbein, invites him to a civil defense class where he sees a model of a futuristic underground military factory. He has the unshakeable feeling he's been inside that building many times before.

Confusion gradually mounts for Gumm. His neighbor Bill Black knows far more about these events than he admits, and, observing this, begins worrying: "Suppose Ragle [Gumm] is becoming sane again?" In fact, Gumm does become sane, and the deception surrounding him (erected to protect and exploit him) begins to unravel.

Gumm tries to escape the town and is turned back by Kafkaesque obstructions. He sees a copy of Time magazine, with himself on the cover as Man of the Year, in a military uniform, at the factory depicted in the model. He tries a second time to escape, this time with Vic, and succeeds. He learns that his idyllic town is a constructed reality designed to protect him from the frightening fact that he lives on a then-future Earth (circa 1998) that is at war against lunar colonists who are fighting for a permanent lunar settlement, politically independent from Earth.

Gumm has a unique ability to predict where the colonists' nuclear strikes will be aimed. Previously Gumm did this work for the military, but then he defected to the colonists' side and planned to secretly emigrate to the Moon. But before this could happen, he began retreating into a fantasy world based largely upon the relatively idyllic surroundings of his extreme youth. He was no longer able to shoulder his responsibility as Earth's lone protector from Lunar-launched nuclear offensives. The fake town was thereby created on the ruins of Kemmerer, Wyoming, to accommodate and rationalize his retreat to childhood so that he could continue predicting nuclear strikes in the guise of submitting entries to a harmless newspaper contest and without the ethical qualms involved with being on the "wrong" side of a civil war. While Gumm regressed by himself to a 1950s mindset, the rest of the town with a few exceptions like Black were all put in a similar state artificially, explaining why hardly anyone else could perceive anomalies.

When Gumm finally remembers his true personal history, he decides to emigrate to the Moon after all because he feels that exploration and migration, as basic human impulses, should never be denied to people by any national or planetary government. Vic rejects this belief, referring to the colonists essentially as aggressors and terrorists, and returns to the simulated town - which has lost its raison d'etre because of Gumm's escape from its environs. The book ends with some hope for peace, because the Lunar colonists are more willing to negotiate than Earth's "One Happy World" regime has been telling its citizens.

== Reception ==
Dave Langford reviewed Time Out of Joint for White Dwarf #57, and stated that "there are classic moments, as when reality blows a fuse and a soft-drink stand disintegrates before Gumm's eyes, leaving only a bit of paper with the words SOFT-DRINK STAND."

Colin Greenland reviewed Time Out of Joint for Imagine magazine, and stated that "As usual, Dick's deadpan investigation of a paranoid world reveals more than a little of the unreal dimensions of our own 'safe' environments."

== Analysis ==
Time Out of Joint, for much of its narrative, is set in a world resembling mainstream 1950s American suburbia, similar to other non-science fiction novels Philip K. Dick wrote in that era. However, the novel centers on the idea of a mechanized, artificial world constructed for the protagonist, Ragle Gumm. This fabricated environment is designed to appear real but contains clues that reveal its artificiality—a central motif in Dick's work, also seen in earlier novels like The Cosmic Puppets and Eye in the Sky. Ragle Gumm's perception of reality begins to unravel when ordinary objects, such as a soft-drink stand, dissolve to reveal their artificial nature. While he fears he is losing his sanity, it is actually a sign that he is seeing through the illusion that others still accept. This echoes themes in Shakespeare's Hamlet, where the supposed madness of the protagonist is a rational response to an irrational society.

Gumm's daily life revolves around a newspaper competition, which he excels at due to his ability to intuitively predict the locations of the 'Little Green Man'. Eventually, it is revealed that this competition is a cover for his real task: predicting missile strikes in a hidden civil war between isolationist Earth factions and pro-exploration dissidents living on the Moon. The authorities, recognizing the psychological toll of this responsibility, allow Gumm to live in a constructed, stress-free world to keep him productive. This strategy, which is initially psychological rather than strictly political, still serves the purpose of preserving lives by sustaining the illusion needed for Gumm to function. However, it is ultimately flawed, as replacing one form of mechanization with another creates new problems. Gumm's eventual recovery of his memories leads him to reject his role in perpetuating the war and to side with the dissidents, aiming to end the conflict.

The novel's artificial town reflects broader themes about the construction of reality, both socially and psychologically. It suggests that societies often create 'factitious unities'—coherent but artificial realities maintained by shared beliefs and enforced conformity, supported by psychological and moral systems that serve practical needs. Ragle's journey involves recognizing inconsistencies in his environment and piecing together a truer, if initially implausible, understanding of reality from scattered evidence.

== See also ==
- Ding an sich, a concept mentioned in the story.
- Simulated reality
- Other works of fiction with a constructed reality:
  - "They", a 1941 story by Robert A. Heinlein about a man surrounded by persons whose job is to convince him that he is insane rather than one of the few genuine people in his world.
  - "The Tunnel Under the World", a 1954 science-fiction story by Frederik Pohl, in which a man wakes up over and over in a fake town established to test advertising campaigns.
  - The Truman Show, a 1998 American comedy-drama film that chronicles the life of a man who discovers he is living in a constructed reality soap opera, televised 24/7.
  - EDtv, a 1999 American comedy film about a man whose life gets turned into a TV show.
  - The Incident, a 2014 Mexican film in which the book notably appears, about people trapped in an infinite loop.
  - Don't Worry Darling, a 2022 American psychological thriller film about a 1950s housewife who discovers she is living against her will in a virtual reality constructed in the modern day.

== Sources ==
- Rossi, Umberto, "Just a Bunch of Words: The Image of the Secluded Family and the Problem of logos in P.K. Dick's Time Out of Joint", Extrapolation, Vol. 37 No. 3, Fall 1996.
- Rossi, Umberto, "The Harmless Yank Hobby: Maps, Games, Missiles and Sundry Paranoias in Time Out of Joint and Gravity's Rainbow", Pynchon Notes #52–53, Spring-Fall 2003, pp. 106–123
- Burton, James (2015). The philosophy of science fiction : Henri Bergson and the fabulations of Philip K. Dick. London: Bloomsbury. ISBN 978-1-47422-766-7.
