= The Owl in Daylight =

Unfinished novel by Philip K. Dick

The Owl in Daylight is a novel Philip K. Dick was writing at the time of his death in 1982. He had already been paid an advance for the book by the publisher and was working against a deadline. After his death, his estate approached other writers about the possibility of someone completing the novel based on his notes, but that proved to be impossible, as he had never formally outlined the story. Dick viewed the novel as his Finnegans Wake. The idea was inspired partly by an entry in the Encyclopædia Britannica on Beethoven that referred to him as the most creative genius of all time, partly by traditional views of what constitutes the human heaven (visions of lights), and finally by the Faust story.

However, Andrew M. Butler's alternative plot summaries seem to suggest that he might have become fascinated by Dante's Divine Comedy as a form of theophany. In his final completed work, The Transmigration of Timothy Archer, his narrator, Angel Archer, shows similar appreciation for Dante's masterpiece, which suggests that this argument may have some merit.

== Claims about possible content ==
Nearly all that is known about one interpretation of the projected plot came from a discussion that Dick had with his journalist friend Gwen Lee on January 10, 1982, which Lee transcribed and later published.

By contrast, Andrew M. Butler cites multiple sources for his own contentions about the possible plot, which are cited below. They include references within Greg Rickman's The Last Testament (1985), Lawrence Sutin's In Pursuit of VALIS (1991), and the interview collection What if Our World is Their Heaven? (2006), cited above.

Both are shown to be correct in The Selected Letters of Philip K Dick Volume 6: 1980 -1982, where one can read Dick's own description of the story and what he wanted to do with it. The plot was to express what he believed was an evolutionary step in humanity, using an interpretation of Joachim de Fiore, where he believed that one age of humanity used the left side of the brain, another the right, and the future would combine the two leading to a greater understanding of what is real. Moreover, the use of Dante was to demonstrate how hell, purgatory and heaven can all be experiences of life, showing how the world is experienced according to the left, right and whole of the brain.

== Possible plot summaries ==
The novel dealt with one Ed Firmley, a composer of scores for B-movie grade sci-fi films, and a race of alien humanoids that had evolved without the development of sound as a basis of communication. The shamans of this alien race would on occasion have visions of Earth and its many sounds. Due to their unique evolution without sound the holy men were incapable of describing these experiences to the rest of their race. They just knew that the place they saw was their heaven. Meanwhile their race was modeled around sight and light, encompassing much more of the electromagnetic spectrum than the limited human vision. In fact, from their perspective, humans were capable of sight but nearly blind, such as a mole appears to a human. Their language involved the telepathic projection of color patterns in precise gradations and following mathematical formulas.

A spaceship carrying members of this race arrives on Earth and they mug Firmley as a cover-up for plugging a bio-chip into his head. This bio-chip is a digitized form of one of the aliens with a link back to the ship – essentially allowing everyone to experience Firmley by proxy. The bio-chip is supposed to be passive, serving only as a means of relaying the mystic experience of sound to an entire race. Soon the alien presence in the bio-chip becomes bored of Firmley’s music, which is bland, schmaltzy schlock, and the pop music that he constantly listens to. As a consequence of this boredom, the bio-chip turns from being passive to active, controlling what Firmley listens to as well as feeding him mathematical formulas that he begins to use as the basis of his compositions. His career, from a financial perspective, dwindles, but he becomes a respected avant-garde artist. The active role the bio-chip takes in the relationship begins frying Firmley’s brain. At this point the aliens make themselves known and offer to remove the chip, but Firmley refuses. He sees himself as an artist whereas before, he was of no consequence, doing what he did simply for money. Firmley decides to give up his body to be transformed into a bio-chip which is in turn implanted into an alien brain. This will also lead to the eventual death of the alien host, but it offers Firmley a chance of experiencing their world of lights, our heaven.

However, Andrew M. Butler offers several alternative summaries which contradict the Lee/Dick interview cited above. A god-like being, Ditheon, fuses the Torah and Jesus Christ into a single being and takes over an individual. A scientist travels through the events of Dante's Divine Comedy, and a Beethoven-like composer is writing a film score, while pursued by aliens.

A scientist creates a theme park that is related to the events of his youth, whereupon a sentient artificial intelligence imprisons him within it, as a youth. He has to travel through Dantean realities (and artist, political activist and gay social networks in the Berkeley of the 1940s and 1950s) to return home and resume his life as an old man.

Alternatively, Dante's Divine Comedy is a portal to alternate subjective realities that represent three ways of perceiving the world.

"The owl in daylight" is a phrase Dick heard on television. It means "not to understand", or "to be blind".

== Tessa Dick version ==
Dick's former wife Tessa wrote her own version of The Owl in Daylight, which was self-published in January 2009. The novel uses little to none of the material that Philip K. Dick was working on at the time of his death, though it does bear many similarities. She remarked, "I attempted to express the spirit of Phil's proposed novel, without using his plot or the one character that he had created ... Phil had written very little about this novel ... It was very sketchy and did not even name any characters ... The Owl in Daylight is my concept of what Phil's novel should be." At the request of the Philip K. Dick Estate, Mrs. Dick voluntarily removed her novel from publication, making copies rare and hard to come by.

== Sources ==
- Butler, Andrew M. (2007). The Pocket Essential Philip K. Dick. Harpenden. pp. 113–114. ISBN 978-1-904048-92-3.
- Rickman, Gregg (1985). Philip K. Dick: The Last Testament. Long Beach: Fragments West/Valentine Press. ISBN 0-916063-02-X.
- Sutin, Lawrence (1991). In Pursuit of Valis: Selections from the Exegesis. Novato: Underwood-Miller. ISBN 0-88733-091-6.
