= Radio Free Albemuth =

1976 novel by Philip K. Dick

- Dust-jacket from the first edition
- Author: Philip K. Dick
- Language: English
- Genre: Dystopian science fiction
- Publisher: Arbor House
- Publication date: 1985
- Publication place: United States
- Media type: Print (Hardcover & Paperback)
- Pages: 214
- ISBN: 0-87795-762-2

Radio Free Albemuth is a dystopian novel by Philip K. Dick, written in 1976 and published posthumously in 1985. Originally titled VALISystem A, it was his first attempt to deal in fiction with his experiences of early 1974. When his publishers at Bantam requested extensive rewrites he canned the project and reworked it into the VALIS trilogy. Arbor House acquired the rights to Radio Free Albemuth in 1985. They then published an edition under the current title (the original was too close to VALIS), prepared from the corrected typescript given by Dick to his friend Tim Powers.

== Plot summary ==
The story is set in the late 1960s in an alternate reality of the United States. The country is ruled by Ferris F. Fremont, a psychopathic, paranoid president. Fremont has established a police state in which civil rights have been suspended. Everyone spies on everyone else, coordinated by the paramilitary youth organization FAP (Friends of the American People). Anyone who disobeys is branded a member of “Aramchek”—a communist underground organization presumably fabricated by the regime. It is in this oppressive atmosphere the two friends, Philip K. Dick and Nicholas Brady, live. The lives of the two change abruptly when Nicholas has a series of mystical experiences. He is struck by a pink beam of light that transmits information directly into his brain. At first, Nicholas is afraid he's losing his mind, but he begins to trust the voice after it warns him of a life-threatening birth defect in his son.Thanks to the doctors’ timely intervention, the child is saved.

The source of the light identifies itself as an extraterrestrial, cosmic intelligence transmitted from a hidden satellite in Earth’s orbit. Nicholas calls it VALIS, or the Voice of Albemuth (a distant system near the star Fomalhaut). VALIS explains to Nicholas that Earth has been controlled for centuries by an evil, blind force—the “Black Iron Prison”—whose current manifestation is the Fremont regime. Nicholas is chosen by VALIS to destroy this prison.

Through his contact with VALIS, Nicholas undergoes physical and psychological changes. He experiences episodes of what is known as theolepsy—a genuine, divine possession. During these episodes, his own ego is pushed aside. VALIS takes full control of his body and brain, enabling Nick to act with superhuman logic, perform complex calculations, and know things he has never learned. At the same time, Nicholas experiences vivid dreams in which, as an early Christian, he is hunted by the Roman emperors’ henchmen. In these dreams, he repeatedly uses the ancient fish symbol as a secret sign of the resistance. Through these visions, Nicholas comes to understand the fundamental truth of the world: The Roman Empire never ended. All of modern America, the Fremont regime, the technology—all of it is just a gigantic, holographic illusion. In truth, humanity is still imprisoned in the Black Iron Prison of the Roman Caesars, and Fremont is merely the current governor of the Empire, continuing the hunt for humanity.

Following the voice’s instructions, Nick moves to Los Angeles. Guided by VALIS’s precise predictions, he builds a career and rises to become an influential executive at a major record label. His mission is to manipulate the system from within. He uses his power to embed subliminal messages in the albums and releases of popular musicians. He hides high-frequency audio signals and the fish symbol in the audio tracks and cover art. These signals are intended to awaken people from the government-imposed brainwashing.

During this time, Nicholas has another recurring dream: he sees a young woman playing the guitar and singing, her music possessing an immense, liberating power. Shortly thereafter, that very woman appears in his Los Angeles office: Sadassa Silvia. She’s actually just looking for a simple office job. Nick recognizes her immediately and hires her. The two quickly realize that Silvia is also receiving instructions from VALIS. It turns out that Silvia is suffering from advanced cancer and doesn't have long to live. When Fremont delivers one of his paranoid speeches on television about the communist conspiracy known as Aramchek, Silvia informs him of the truth behind it all. Her real last name is Aramchek. She changed it in order to survive under the Fremont regime. Her mother, a staunch communist in Southern California, had recruited Fremont for the Communist Party in the 1950s.

President Ferris F. Fremont is, in fact, a Soviet spy. He was planted by the Kremlin at the helm of the United States with the goal of completely destroying America from within by establishing a paranoid tyranny, causing economic ruin, and bringing about the moral collapse of society. The so-called terrorist organization “Aramchek” is purely a fabrication by Fremont. Fremont eventually captures and imprisons Dick and Brady after the latter attempts to produce and distribute a record that contains subliminal messages of revolt against the current dictatorship. Brady and Silvia are executed, and Dick narrates the concluding passage about his life in a concentration camp, while his supposedly latest work is actually penned by a ghost writer and regime-approved hack. Suddenly, however, he hears music blaring from a transistor radio which contains the same subliminal message. He and his friends, it turns out, were just a decoy set up by VALIS to deter the government from stopping a much more popular A-List band from releasing a similar record with a better-established recording company. As Dick realizes this and hears youngsters repeating the lyrics, he realizes that salvation may lie within the hearts and minds of the next generation.

== Reception ==
Gerald Jonas of The New York Times thought that the novel "may have been merely a first draft (and an abandoned first draft at that), but this book is not Dick at his best."

Dave Langford reviewed Radio Free Albemuth for White Dwarf #92, and stated that "Dick: understood fear and corruption too well. I was less convinced by the visionary passages, though there's a great line when nervy politicians destroy the alien satellite: 'They shot down God.'"

J. Michael Caparula reviewed Radio Free Albemuth in Space Gamer/Fantasy Gamer No. 80. Caparula commented that "The final result presents a satisfying (albeit enigmatic) conclusion to his trilogy of Valis novels (Valis and The Divine Invasion being the other two)."

It was selected for inclusion in Science Fiction: The 101 Best Novels 1985-2010 by authors Damien Broderick and Paul Di Filippo.

== Relationship to VALIS ==
When he rewrote Radio Free Albemuth as VALIS, Dick incorporated the plotline of Radio Free Albemuth as a backdrop film (also titled VALIS) that recapitulated the central theological and existential concerns of his novel as a mise en abyme - that is, a miniature copy of his central preoccupations at this stage of his literary career, common to both works. The word "albemuth" was derived by Dick from the Arabic word Al Behemoth, "the whale", itself an oblique reference to Fomalhaut, the star Dick at one time believed VALIS came from in real life.

== Film adaptation ==
John Alan Simon wrote, produced and directed a film adaptation of Radio Free Albemuth. Canadian singer-songwriter Alanis Morissette stars as Sadassa Silvia. Filming took place in October 2007 at Los Angeles' Lacy Street Studios and multiple other locations. The film premiered in February 2010 at the Sedona Film Festival as a work in-progress. It was released as a limited release (and VOD) on June 27, 2014.

== Sources ==
- Charles N. Brown and William G. Contento. "The Locus Index to Science Fiction (1984-1998)".
- Dick, Philip K. (1985). Radio Free Albemuth. New York: Arbor House.
- Mackey, Douglas A. (1988). Philip K. Dick. Boston: Twayne. ISBN 0-8057-7515-3.
