= Stewart Mackinnon =

Scottish film producer

- Occupation: Film producer
- Years active: 1976–present

Stewart Mackinnon is a Scottish film and television producer, founder and former CEO of Headline Pictures. He produced the film Quartet, the international Emmy winning television film Peter And Wendy, and the Amazon Studios series The Man in the High Castle. In 2020, he founded Circle Pictures.

== Artist ==
Mackinnon studied at the Edinburgh College of Art where he was awarded an Andrew Grant Scholarship before moving to London to attend the Royal College of Art where he won the Drawing Prize and contributed to and co-edited the RCA magazine Ark in the 1970s.

Mackinnon designed the artwork for the British TV movie The War Game and went on to draw illustrations for Oz, Nova, Time Out, the Edinburg Review, Spare Rib, Ambit, The Times, Sunday Times and Management Today, and was featured in the Radical Illustrators issue of Illustrators magazine (no.38) published in 1981 by the Association of Illustrators in which co-editor George Snow singled out Mackinnon as “perhaps the greatest single influence on today’s Radical Illustrators.”

== Producer ==
In the 1970s and 80s Mackinnon directed and produced a number of films including the Brechtian film Because I am King and Ends and Means written by Andy McSmith.

Mackinnon went on to found Trade Films which produced films and television such as The Miners' Campaign Video Tapes, When the Dog Bites, Woodbine Place, Border Crossing, an interview with Paul Rotha, and the Northern News Reel, which was distributed to trade unions and members of the Labour movement around the UK. Working closely with Murray Martin (Amber Films) and other independent film makers, Stewart was closely involved in devising the Workshop Declaration (1982) in partnership with the film union ACTT and Channel 4. The Workshops worked with their local communities, women's organisations and ethnic minority communities, and by 1988, some 44 workshops had had films funded and screened by Channel 4. So began a decade of experiment with progressive and aesthetically avant-garde documentaries and dramas screened on British television, which continued until 1990. Trade Films also established the first film and television archive in the North East of England, the Northern Film and Television Archive.

In 1988 Mackinnon co-founded the Northern Screen Commission with Sir Peter Carr, the North East Media Development Council (NEMDC - a policy forum), the North East Media Development Agency (NEMDA - the operational arm) and the North East Media Training Centre (NEMTC) which also provided a course for deaf students.

Mackinnon went on to found Common Features, which produced films such as This Little Life, winner of the BANFF Award and the Dennis Potter Award.

In 2005 Mackinnon founded Headline Pictures. The company has developed and produced film and television including The Man in the High Castle for Amazon Studios written by X-Files creator Frank Spotnitz, based on the novel by Philip K. Dick; the feature film Quartet, directed by Dustin Hoffman; and feature film The Invisible Woman directed by Ralph Fiennes.

In 2020, Mackinnon and Jere Sulivan founded Circle Pictures, a company to produce feature films and television drama.

== Selected filmography ==
- Because I am King (1980, directed by Stewart Mackinnon)
- Ends and Means (1983, directed by Stewart Mackinnon written by Andy McSmith)
- The Miner's Campaign Tapes (1984, co-produced by Stewart Mackinnon) winner of the Grierson Award.
- When the Dog Bites (1988, directed by Penny Woolcock)
- This Little Life (2003, directed by Sarah Gavron) winner of an RTS Award, Dennis Potter Award and BANFF Award.
- Bag of Bones (2011, adapted by Matt Venne from the Stephen King novel)
- Quartet (2012, directed by Dustin Hoffman)
- The Invisible Woman (2013, directed by Ralph Fiennes)
- The Saboteurs (2015, written by Petter S. Rosenlund) and winner of the Prix Italia.
- Peter & Wendy (2015, directed by Diarmuid Lawrence and winner of an international Emmy)
- The Man in the high Castle (2015, adapted by Frank Spotnitz)
