= Peter and Wendy (film) =

2015 television film

- Genre: Adventure; Fantasy
- Written by: Adrian Hodges
- Directed by: Diarmuid Lawrence
- Starring: Stanley Tucci; Paloma Faith; Laura Fraser; Hazel Doupe; Woody Norman; Zak Sutcliffe; Rasmus Hardiker; Dan Tetsell; Asim Chaudhry; Ricky Champ
- Country of origin: United Kingdom

Production
- Producers: Stewart Mackinnon; Christian Baute
- Running time: 120 minutes
- Production company: Headline Pictures

Original release
- Network: ITV
- Release: 26 December – 30 December 2015

Peter and Wendy is a 2015 television film made for ITV in the United Kingdom. It was written by Adrian Hodges, directed by Diarmuid Lawrence and produced by Stewart Mackinnon and Christian Baute, Headline Pictures.

The film is based on the play and novel by J. M. Barrie, blending it with an original narrative set in the present day. The film draws a connection between the stories of Barrie and the real life Great Ormond Street Hospital, to which Barrie gave the rights to the story in 1929, a few years before his death.

It was first broadcast on 26 December 2015.

== Plot ==
Lucy Rose is a teenage girl with a heart condition who is awaiting risky surgery that would save her life. Late in the night before her operation she is given an original first edition copy of Peter Pan by a staff member from within the stored confines of the museum dedicated to James Matthew Barrie. After reading it to a group of child patients, she dreams she is Wendy, and her fellow child patients are Lost Boys and the Darling brothers, who are all taken by Peter Pan to Neverland, where they meet Tiger Lily and battle pirates led by Captain Hook.

== Cast ==
- Stanley Tucci as Captain Hook / Mr. Darling / Dr. Wylie
- Dan Tetsell as Ratcliffe / Dalton
- Laura Elphinstone as Starkey / Ali
- Rasmus Hardiker as Smee / Smith
- Gershwyn Eustache Jnr as Cecco / Yeboah
- Ricky Champ as Bill Jukes / Malik
- Asim Chaudhry as Mullins / Johnson
- Laura Fraser as Mrs. Darling / Julie Rose
- Hazel Doupe as Wendy Darling / Lucy Rose
- Natifa Mai as Tiger Lily / Jaya
- Zak Sutcliffe as Peter Pan
- Paloma Faith as Tinker Bell
- Woody Norman as Curly / Rory

== Awards ==
The film won an International Emmy in 2016, and a Special Award for Best Director at the Parma Film Music Festival in 2016.

== Reception ==
The film was generally well received by critics.
