= Tosca's Kiss =

- Italian: Il Bacio di Tosca
- Directed by: Daniel Schmid
- Starring: Sara Scuderi; Giuseppe Manacchini; Giulietta Simionato; Leonida Bellon; Salvatore Locapo; Giovanni Puligheddu; Della Benning; Cesare Perugia; Giuseppina Sani; Giulia Scaramelli
- Cinematography: Renato Berta
- Distributed by: T&C Film, Zürich
- Release date: 1984
- Running time: 87 minutes
- Country: Switzerland
- Language: Italian

Tosca's Kiss (Italian: Il Bacio di Tosca) is a 1984 film directed by Daniel Schmid, a documentary of life in the Casa di Riposo per Musicisti of Milan, the world's first nursing home for retired opera singers, founded by composer Giuseppe Verdi in 1896. The New York Times review called it "Bravissimo!"

Dustin Hoffman cited Il Bacio di Tosca as a direct inspiration for his 2012 film Quartet.

== Plot ==
The film follows retired soprano Sara Scuderi and the other tenants of the retirement home, as they re-live and re-enact the roles which made them famous.

== Cast ==
- Sara Scuderi
- Giuseppe Manacchini
- Giulietta Simionato
- Leonida Bellon
- Salvatore Locapo
- Giovanni Puligheddu
- Della Benning
- Cesare Perugia
- Giuseppina Sani
- Giulia Scaramelli

== Awards ==
The film received the Georges Delerue Prize for Best Musical Documentary at the Ghent International Film Festival in 1985 and the International Documentary Association IDA Award in 1986.
