= The Invisible Woman (2013 film) =

- Theatrical release poster
- Directed by: Ralph Fiennes
- Written by: Abi Morgan
- Based on: The Invisible Woman by Claire Tomalin
- Produced by: Gabrielle Tana; Stewart Mackinnon; Christian Baute; Carolyn Marks Blackwood
- Starring: Ralph Fiennes; Felicity Jones; Kristin Scott Thomas; Tom Hollander; Joanna Scanlan; John Kavanagh
- Cinematography: Rob Hardy
- Edited by: Nicolas Gaster
- Music by: Ilan Eshkeri
- Production companies: WestEnd Films; Headline Pictures; BBC Films; BFI; Magnolia Mae Films; Taeoo Entertainment
- Distributed by: Lionsgate
- Release dates: 31 August 2013 (Telluride); 7 February 2014 (UK)
- Running time: 111 minutes
- Country: United Kingdom
- Language: English
- Budget: £12 million
- Box office: $3.2 million

The Invisible Woman is a 2013 British biographical drama film directed by Ralph Fiennes and starring Fiennes, Felicity Jones, Kristin Scott Thomas and Tom Hollander. Written by Abi Morgan, and based on the 1990 book of the same name by Claire Tomalin, the film is about the affair between Charles Dickens and Nelly Ternan, which lasted for thirteen years until his death in 1870. The film premiered at the Telluride Film Festival on 31 August 2013, and was released in the United Kingdom on 7 February 2014. The film received a Best Costume Design nomination (Michael O'Connor) at the 86th Academy Awards.

== Plot ==
In 1857, forty-five-year-old Charles Dickens notices eighteen-year-old actress Ellen "Nelly" Ternan while she is performing at London's Haymarket Theatre. Dickens later casts her, along with her mother and sister Maria, in his three-performance production of Wilkie Collins's The Frozen Deep at Free Trade Hall in Manchester for the benefit of the widow of Dickens's old friend, Douglas Jerrold. At a party following the performance, Dickens and Nelly share a moment alone.

Nelly and her family attend one of Dickens's readings at the Harrow Speech Room. Delighted to see Nelly again, Dickens takes the Ternans to Doncaster Racecourse. No longer having feelings for his wife Catherine, who is busy taking care of their ten children and does not share his passion for literature, Dickens falls for Nelly. Nelly, in turn, is fascinated by Dickens's fame and ideas.

One morning, Dickens slips out of Gads Hill Place, Higham, Kent, his country home, and walks to East London to see Nelly in a play. Her mother invites him to their cottage. Noticing the looks between them, Mrs. Ternan cautions him that she cannot afford to risk Nelly's reputation. Dickens responds that he has no intention of compromising Nelly's name. After organising a reading and fundraiser to benefit London's "fallen women" and their children, Dickens invites the Ternans to his town house.

Mrs. Ternan thinks that this blossoming relationship may offer Nelly the financially stable future she would not find on stage, believing that Nelly is not as talented as her sisters. Overhearing her, Nelly is angered and confused by her mother's plans for her to become the mistress of a married man. Catherine mistakenly receives Dickens's gemstone bracelet for Nelly and is ordered by Dickens to bring it to Nelly. Catherine warns her of the pain of being with Dickens, while Nelly is disturbed by his cruelty.

Dickens and Collins arrive late to Nelly's birthday party and talk her into visiting the house that Collins shares with his mistress, Caroline Graves. After demanding to leave, she confronts Dickens about insulting her honour by bringing her there and his suggested arrangement of her being his whore. After arguing that he no longer loves Catherine, Dickens asks to enter Nelly's home and kisses her.

On a walk, Dickens and Nelly have an encounter with his son, who is saddened to see her affections with his father. Dickens later announces in The Times his "amicable" separation from Catherine while denying the rumours of his affair. The news devastate his wife and children.

Mrs. Ternan assures Nelly that Dickens is an honourable man, while Collins tells Nelly that he is a great man and that she has a choice. Nelly argues that only men have the freedom to choose and suggests that she has few other options in life. He urges her to be with Dickens and "break conventions". Nelly visits Dickens, who excitedly reveals that he completed Great Expectations. Nelly expresses her approval of the ending, which does not bring Estella and Pip together. They become lovers.

Nelly becomes pregnant. She and Dickens speak of the gossip of their affair spreading from city to city. Their child is stillborn. After saving a lock of the child's hair, Dickens signs the death certificate with a false name, "M. Charles Tringham".

After returning to England from France in the spring of 1865, Dickens and Nelly board a train at Folkestone for London. Near Staplehurst in Kent, the train derails. As he speaks to Nelly, the workers ask the uninjured Dickens to assist with wounded passengers in the wreckage. He pretends he was travelling alone, to avoid public scandal. As he walks away to help, she watches him retrieve a page from a work in progress. (Note: Our Mutual Friend.)

Dickens installs Nelly at a country house and promises to visit twice weekly, though acknowledges that his family has a claim on his time. Nelly remains his secret mistress until his death in 1870. In 1876, she marries Oxford graduate George Wharton-Robinson, who is twelve years her junior and unaware that she was once the mistress of Charles Dickens. They have a son together. Only Reverend Benham knows about the affair and Nelly's real age. In 1883, while watching her son perform in a school play, Nelly recalls the lines she spoke in The Frozen Deep.

== Cast ==
- Ralph Fiennes as Charles Dickens
- Felicity Jones as Nelly Ternan
- Kristin Scott Thomas as Mrs. Ternan
- Tom Hollander as Wilkie Collins
- Joanna Scanlan as Catherine Dickens
- Michelle Fairley as Caroline Graves
- Jonathan Harden as Mr. Arnott
- Tom Burke as Mr. George Wharton Robinson
- Perdita Weeks as Maria Ternan
- Michael Marcus as Charley Dickens
- John Kavanagh as Reverend Benham
- Amanda Hale as Fanny Ternan

== Production ==
Headline Pictures' Stewart Mackinnon first acquired the film rights to Claire Tomalin's biography and commissioned Abi Morgan to write the screenplay with development funding from BBC Films and the British Film Institute. The screenplay was written and Mackinnon then approached a number of co-producers and directors before contracting Gabrielle Tana, who had worked with Fiennes on Coriolanus, his directorial debut. She proposed the project to Fiennes in 2010, after he finished Coriolanus. Headline then contracted Fiennes and Tana. Fiennes' participation as director was announced in July 2011. He did not know much about Dickens before taking on the project: "I was ignorant. I had only read Little Dorrit. I knew his obvious ones—Nicholas Nickleby, Oliver Twist, Great Expectations—through adaptations. And Christmas Carol. I didn't know much about the man."

Fiennes initially approached another actor to play the role of Dickens but it did not work out and he eventually played the part. He worked closely with Abi Morgan on the script and little by little he warmed to the idea of playing Dickens. Fiennes and Morgan often met with Tomalin who provided guidance, but she wished to remain outside the actual screenwriting. The screenplay is structured around a series of "small tragedies and moments of catalyst" described in Tomalin's book, which defined their affair according to her. The actresses considered for the role of Nelly Ternan included Carey Mulligan, Abbie Cornish, and Felicity Jones. Jones was officially cast in December 2011. Her casting occurred before Fiennes agreed to portray Dickens.

Principal photography began in April 2012 with a planned filming schedule of ten weeks in Kent and London. Exteriors were shot at Camber Sands which stood in for Margate where the 1870s scenes were set. Filming also took place for two days at Leavesden Film Studios in Hertfordshire.

The film had an operating budget of £12 million.

== Release ==
The Invisible Woman premiered at the Telluride Film Festival on 31 August 2013. The first trailer was launched on 4 October 2013. The film had a limited release in the United States on 25 December 2013 and opened in the United Kingdom on 7 February 2014.

== Reception ==
=== Box office ===
The Invisible Woman earned £1,026,591.43 ($1,373,682) at the Box Office in the United Kingdom and $1,229,853 in the United States. The total worldwide gross was £2,380,130.78 ($3,184,853).

=== Critical response ===
Review aggregator Rotten Tomatoes calculated a 75% approval rating, with an average score of 6.73/10, based on 158 reviews. The website's critical consensus reads, "Its deliberate pace will frustrate some viewers, but for fans of handsomely mounted period drama, The Invisible Woman offers visual as well as emotional cinematic nourishment." On review aggregator Metacritic, the film holds a weighted average score of 75/100, based on 41 reviews from mainstream critics, indicating "generally favorable reviews".

In his review on RogerEbert.com, Godfrey Cheshire gave the film three and a half out of four stars, calling it "a formidable achievement for Fiennes as both actor and director". Cheshire wrote that the story is told with "extraordinary delicacy and cinematic intelligence" and with a "finely calibrated poetic obliqueness that draws the viewer into the relationship's gradual unfolding". Cheshire continued:

In Fiennes' handling, very little is stated in a straightforward or obvious way. It's almost as if he took Abi Morgan's screenplay ... and stripped away its most utilitarian dialogue, leaving only hints and suggestions of emotions that then must be fleshed out by the actors. The method ... makes for a narrative that's constantly evocative, mysterious, almost impressionistic, and that involves the viewer in the pleasurably engrossing game of puzzling out the characters' aim and motives.

Cheshire also praised the performances of the leading actors, including Fiennes who "creates an exuberant portrait of Dickens that encompasses his vanity and selfishness as well as his bounteousness and thirst for life", Jones who is "luminous" and "conveys the young woman's mix of awe, intoxication and anxiety as she is drawn inexorably into the orbit of a powerful older man", and Scanlan who shows Catherine Dickens' "dignity and grace in heart-rending circumstances". Cheshire concluded:

The Invisible Woman is one of those evanescent conjurings of a bygone time in which every part serves the whole. The most entrancing and persuasive evocation of Victorian England offered in any recent film, it reflects superb work on the parts of many contributors.

In his review for The Guardian, Peter Bradshaw gave the film four out of five stars, calling the film "piercingly intimate and intelligent" and praises Fiennes for his "strength as a director" and for his "richly sanguine" portrayal of Charles Dickens. Bradshaw also praises Scanlan for her "shrewd and sensitive performance as Dickens's neglected wife". Bradshaw concluded, "This is an engrossing drama, with excellent performances and tremendous design by Maria Djurkovic."

In his review for The Telegraph, Tim Robey gave the film four out of five stars. Robey focused on the acting performances, especially Scanlan who "gives arguably the standout performance in this generally smashing cast ... in two perfectly weighted, emotionally crushing scenes".

In his review in the New York Observer, Rex Reed called the film "a cogently written and elegantly appointed period piece that relates passages in his books to emotions in his personal life, holding the attention and shedding light on one of literature’s most fascinating footnotes".
