= This Little Life =

2003 TV film drama

This Little Life is a 2003 TV film drama starring Kate Ashfield, Peter Mullan and Linda Bassett. The story follows the life of a married couple following the premature birth of their son.

The film was produced by Stewart Mackinnon (Headline Pictures), directed by Sarah Gavron and written by Rosemary Kay who was awarded the Dennis Potter Award for the script and a BAFTA for Best New Writer for the film. The film score was composed by Dario Marianelli.

== Reception ==
Shown to critical acclaim at International Festivals, the film was awarded the Jury Prize for Best Debut Feature at the Toronto International Film Festival, won Best Film at the Banff TV awards, in Canada, and was awarded a special Prix Europa. At the 2004 Royal Television Society Programme Awards, it won Best Single Drama, while Kate Ashfield won Actor: Female and Sarah Gavron won Newcomer – Behind the Scenes. It was nominated for Best Single Drama for the BAFTA awards and was nominated for best film in the BFI Awards.
