= The Man in the High Castle (TV series) =

American sci-fi TV series (2015–2019)

- Genre: Alternate history; Drama; Dystopian; Sci-fi
- Created by: Frank Spotnitz
- Based on: The Man in the High Castle by Philip K. Dick
- Showrunners: Frank Spotnitz (season 1); Erik Oleson (season 2); Eric Overmyer (season 3); David Scarpa (season 4)
- Starring: Alexa Davalos; Rupert Evans; Luke Kleintank; DJ Qualls; Joel de la Fuente; Cary-Hiroyuki Tagawa; Rufus Sewell; Brennan Brown; Callum Keith Rennie; Bella Heathcote; Chelah Horsdal; Michael Gaston; Jason O'Mara; Frances Turner
- Opening theme: "Edelweiss", performed by Jeanette Olsson
- Composers: Henry Jackman; Dominic Lewis
- Country of origin: United States
- Original languages: English; German; Japanese
- No. of seasons: 4
- No. of episodes: 40

Production
- Executive producers: Ridley Scott; Frank Spotnitz; Christian Baute; Isa Dick Hackett; Stewart Mackinnon; Christopher Tricarico
- Producers: Michael Cedar; Jean Higgins; Jordan Sheehan; David W. Zucker
- Production locations: Seattle, Washington; Monroe, Washington; Vancouver, British Columbia
- Cinematography: James Hawkinson; Gonzalo Amat
- Editor: Kathrynn Himoff
- Running time: 45–70 minutes
- Production companies: Amazon Studios; Scott Free Productions; Electric Shepherd Productions; Headline Pictures; Big Light Productions; Picrow; Reunion Pictures

Original release
- Network: Amazon Prime Video
- Release: January 15, 2015 – November 15, 2019

The Man in the High Castle is an American dystopian alternate history television series created for the streaming service Amazon Prime Video, depicting a parallel universe in which the Axis powers of Nazi Germany and the Empire of Japan rule the world after their victory in World War II. It was created by Frank Spotnitz and produced by Amazon Studios, Ridley Scott's Scott Free Productions (with Scott as executive producer), Headline Pictures, Electric Shepherd Productions, and Big Light Productions. It is based on the 1962 novel The Man in the High Castle by Philip K. Dick.

The pilot premiered in January 2015, and Amazon ordered a ten-episode season the following month which was released in November. A second season of ten episodes premiered in December 2016, and a third season was released on October 5, 2018. The fourth and final season premiered on November 15, 2019.

== Setting ==
The US as depicted in the television series. Though Denver is the capital of the Neutral Zone, Cañon City, Colorado, is a major setting.

The Man in the High Castle is set in 1962 in an alternate history in which the Axis powers have won World War II in 1946 after Giuseppe Zangara assassinates the president-elect of the United States, Franklin D. Roosevelt, in 1933. A series of developments follow that include the Germans dropping a nuclear weapon on Washington, D.C. (now renamed "District of Contamination") in late 1945. The Japanese launch a ground invasion of the U.S. West Coast. The American federal government surrenders, though it takes another year for the Axis and their American collaborators to pacify the country. The Germans build concentration camps for the enslavement and eventual extermination of Jewish Americans and African Americans and commit massacres in cities such as Cincinnati.

By 1962, the German Reich extends to Europe and Africa and the Empire of Japan comprises Asia and Oceania, but most of the series is set in the former U.S. and in Germany proper. Adolf Hitler is dictator of this German Reich, and the emperor of Japan rules most of the rest of the world. Although the real-world Axis included Fascist Italy under the dictatorship of Benito Mussolini, only the Japanese and German factions of the Axis are depicted. There are no Italians in the scenario, nor is Mussolini accounted for, except as an image in one of the mysterious newsreels with the Führer.

Flag of the Japanese Pacific States, part of the Empire of Japan

Western North America, the "Japanese Pacific States", is occupied by the technologically less advanced Shōwa-era Empire of Japan, which has imposed its hierarchical society on their part of the former United States. The Empire treats non-Japanese as subjects with fewer rights and little prospect of advancement in Imperial society, although some upper-class Japanese are fascinated by pre-war American culture. Japan's trade and science ministers work in the Pacific States' capital, San Francisco, California. The Yakuza wield extensive influence in Japanese America and are largely tolerated by the Kempeitai. In season 4, an organization calling itself the Black Communist Rebellion takes up arms against the Japanese, gaining ground as the Empire's strength wanes.

Flag of Nazi America, part of the Greater Nazi Reich

Eastern and Midwestern North America is a colony controlled by the Greater Nazi Reich (GNR) under an aging Hitler. Headed by a "Reichsmarschall of North America", it is commonly referred to as "Nazi America" or "the American Reich" and its capital is New York City, which survived the war and invasion largely intact. The Nazis continue to hunt minorities and kill the physically and mentally ill. Fictional developments of 1960s technology, such as video phones, live surveillance video (CCTV), and supersonic airliners that were technologically available in the 1960s but never commercially produced, are seen in the series.

Japan and Germany have left the Rocky Mountains to serve as a buffer zone between the Japanese Pacific States and Nazi America due to Cold War–like tensions between the two powers. The Neutral Zone has no substantial government, economy, or armed forces, and is left to fend for itself while the two rival empires pursue their ambitions. Resistance groups use the Neutral Zone as a haven and the Germans and Japanese intermittently send spies into the region, both to monitor the Neutral Zone and each other.

Films collected by the "Man in the High Castle" are newsreels depicting numerous other Earths, including some where the Allies were victorious, some featuring executed Allied leaders (such as Winston Churchill and Joseph Stalin), and some where an American resistance is doing well. The events depicted include real history and possible alternative timelines.

== Cast ==
=== Main ===
- Alexa Davalos as Juliana Crain, a young woman from San Francisco who is outwardly happy living under Japanese control. She is an expert in aikido and is friendly with the Japanese people who live in San Francisco. As Juliana learns of the Man in the High Castle and his films, she begins to rebel.
- Rupert Evans as Frank Frink (seasons 1–3), Juliana's boyfriend. He works in a factory creating replicas of prewar American pistols, and creates original jewelry and sketches on his own time. Frank's grandfather was Jewish, making him a target of discrimination. When Juliana vanishes just after the police kill her sister, Frank is taken into custody. Soon after, he turns against the state and works with the American Resistance.
- Luke Kleintank as Joe Blake (seasons 1–3), a new recruit to the underground American Resistance who is actually an agent working for the Schutzstaffel (SS), under Obergruppenführer John Smith. He transports a reel of the forbidden film The Grasshopper Lies Heavy to the neutral Rocky Mountain States as part of his mission to infiltrate the Resistance. He meets Juliana and quickly falls in love with her, leading to him questioning his allegiance to the Reich.
- DJ Qualls as Ed McCarthy (seasons 1–3), Frank's co-worker and friend. He closely follows politics and cares very much about Juliana and Frank's well-being.
- Joel de la Fuente as Colonel Takeshi Kido, the chief inspector who is the ruthless head of the Kempeitai stationed in San Francisco
- Cary-Hiroyuki Tagawa as Nobusuke Tagomi (seasons 1–3), the Trade Minister of the Japanese Pacific States. His true loyalties are ambiguous throughout the first season.
- Rufus Sewell as John Smith, an SS Obergruppenführer, later promoted to Oberst-Gruppenführer, and then to Reichsmarschall of the colony of North America (near series end becoming Reichsführer of a newly autonomous North American Reich) who is investigating the Resistance in New York. He is a natural-born American who had served in the US Army Signal Corps before taking the Reich's offer to join them. He initially lives a comfortable suburban life with a wife and three children but subsequently moves the family to Manhattan.
- Chelah Horsdal as Helen Smith, John Smith's wife and a socialite in New York City. A natural-born American before the war, she plays an enormous role in John Smith switching allegiance to the Nazis. She later faces a crisis about the consequences of that decision when her own son gives his life for the regime and her whole world collapses.
- Brennan Brown as Robert Childan, an antique store owner who makes secret deals with Frank
- Callum Keith Rennie as Gary Connell (season 2), leader of the West Coast Resistance movement and enforcer for Abendsen
- Bella Heathcote as Nicole Dörmer (seasons 2–3), a young Berlin-born filmmaker who crosses paths with Joe, and moves to the American Reich in the third season
- Michael Gaston as Mark Sampson (seasons 1–3), a Jewish friend of Frank's living in San Francisco, who later relocates to the Neutral Zone
- Jason O'Mara as Wyatt Price, also known as Liam (seasons 3–4), an Irishman who is a black market supplier of information to Juliana
- Frances Turner as Bell Mallory (season 4), the leader of the Black Communist Rebellion (BCR) in San Francisco

=== Recurring ===
==== Greater Nazi Reich ====
Officials

- Aaron Blakely as Erich Raeder (seasons 1–3), an SS-Sturmbannführer, John Smith's right-hand man
- Carsten Norgaard as Rudolph Wegener (seasons 1, 3), a disillusioned high-ranking Nazi official who trades secrets with Tagomi and is friends with John Smith
- Bernhard Forcher as Hugo Reiss (season 1), the German ambassador to the Japanese Pacific States
- Aubrey Deeker as Kurt Scausch (season 1), a member of the SS working alongside Hugo Reiss
- Neal Bledsoe as SS-Captain Connolly (season 1), an American SS officer serving under John Smith, later revealed to be a spy working for Reinhard Heydrich
- Raresh DiMofte as Karl Müller (season 1), a SS-Sturmbannführer who was sent to San Francisco in order to assassinate the Japanese crown prince to provoke a war between the GNR and JPS
- Sebastian Roché as Martin Heusmann (seasons 2–3), a high-ranking Reichsminister in the Nazi government and Joe Blake's biological father
- Adrian Hough as Carl Weber (season 3), the Nazi ambassador to the JPS, replacing Hugo Reiss
- Eric Lange as General Whitcroft (season 4), John Smith's second-in-command
- Marc Rissmann as Wilhelm Goertzmann (season 4), an Obergruppenführer from Berlin

Civilians

- Jessie Fraser as Rita Pearce (seasons 1–2), Joe's lover, who leaves him after finding out about Juliana
- Carter Ryan Evancic as Buddy Pearce (seasons 1–2), Rita's son, who viewed Joe as a surrogate father
- Kevin McNulty as Dr. Gerald Adler (seasons 1–2), John's family doctor who diagnosed Thomas
- Gillian Barber as Alice Adler (seasons 2–3), Gerald's wife, who begins to become paranoid of the Smiths
- Emily Holmes as Lucy Collins (seasons 2–3), a friend of Helen's and Juliana's
- Kurt Evans as Henry Collins (season 2), Lucy's husband, who was executed during a broadcast for revealing Hitler's death
- Giles Panton as Billy Turner (seasons 3–4), a Nazi Reich American advertising executive who is working with Nicole Dörmer to erase the memories of the former U.S. from the minds of the citizens in the Nazi Reich America
- Laura Mennell as Thelma Harris (season 3), a closeted lesbian gossip column reporter in New York City
- Jeffrey Nordling as Daniel Ryan (season 3), a Jungian therapist employed to treat Helen Smith's grief following the death of her son Thomas
- Diane Greenwood as Fatima Hassan (season 3), a traveler from a parallel world who was captured by the Nazis
- Charlie Hofheimer as Daniel Levine (season 4), John's Jewish friend who was executed after the Nazis took over America. In the alt-world, he is alive.
- Rachel Nichols as Martha (season 4), Helen Smith's "wife-companion" assigned by the Reich to keep an eye on her

John Smith's family/household

- Quinn Lord as Thomas Smith, John and Helen's son and the eldest child. A member of the Hitler Youth, it is later revealed that he has inherited a form of muscular dystrophy (facioscapulohumeral muscular dystrophy) from his father's side of the family. Learning this, he turns himself in to the Reich Sanitation Services and is euthanized. In season 4, Lord plays Thomas in an alternate universe in which the Axis lost the war.
- Genea Charpentier as Jennifer Smith, John and Helen's daughter
- Gracyn Shinyei as Amy Smith, John and Helen's daughter and youngest child
- Meg Heus as Bridget (seasons 3–4), a maid of the Smiths in their new apartment

Rudolph Wegener's family

- Stefanie von Pfetten as Kathrina Wegener (seasons 1–2), Rudolph's ex-wife
- Jara Zeimer as Klaudia Wegener (season 1), Rudolph and Kathrina's daughter
- Luke Roessler as Otto Wegener (season 1), Rudolph and Kathrina's son, who has an estranged relationship with his father

==== Japanese Pacific States ====
Officials

- Lee Shorten as Hiroyuki Yoshida (seasons 1–2), a sergeant and Inspector Kido's right-hand man
- Arnold Chun as Kotomichi, Tagomi's aide-de-camp, who came from the parallel world after his hometown, Nagasaki, was destroyed by an American atomic bomb
- Daisuke Tsuji as the Crown Prince of Japan (season 1)
- Mayumi Yoshida as the Crown Princess of Japan (seasons 1, 4)
- Amy Okuda as Christine Tanaka (season 1), an office worker working in the Nippon Building
- Tzi Ma as General Hidehisa Onoda (season 2), a leading member of the Japanese Army
- Bruce Locke as General Yamori (season 4), a hardline Japanese general in favour of continuing the occupation of the JPS
- Akie Kotabe as Nakamura (season 3), a Japanese-American sergeant of mixed ethnicity who works under Kido as Yoshida's replacement
- Eijiro Ozaki as Admiral Inokuchi (seasons 3–4), an admiral and the head of the Imperial Japanese Navy fleet stationed in the San Francisco Bay
- Sen Mitsuji as Toru Kido (season 4), Inspector Kido's son who suffers from PTSD
- Rich Ting as Iijima (season 4), a Japanese captain

Civilians

- Jack Kehler as Harlan Wyndam-Matson (season 1), the owner of the factory where Frank and Ed work
- Frank C. Turner as Jim McCarthy (season 1), Ed's grandfather who dislikes the American resistance
- Michael Eber as Doni (season 1), a person in the same aikido class as Juliana, who seems to have a crush on her
- Hiro Kanagawa as Taishi Okamura (seasons 1–2), the leader of a Yakuza based in the Pacific States
- Louis Ozawa Changchien as Paul Kasoura (seasons 1–2), a wealthy lawyer who collects prewar American memorabilia
- Tao Okamoto as Betty Kasoura (season 1), Paul's wife
- Michael Hagiwara as Okami (season 4), a Yakuza boss operating in the JPS
- Chika Kanamoto as Yukiko (season 4), Childan's assistant and later wife

Juliana Crain's family

- Daniel Roebuck as Arnold Walker (seasons 1–2), Juliana's step-father and Trudy's father
- Macall Gordon as Anne Crain Walker (seasons 1–2), Juliana's mother who is still bitter about losing her husband in World War II
- Conor Leslie as Trudy Walker (seasons 1–3), Juliana's half-sister who is shot dead by the Kempeitai. However, she is shown alive at the end of season 2, revealed in the third season to be from an alternate timeline in which it was Juliana who died.

Frank Frink's family

- Christine Chatelain as Laura Crothers (seasons 1–2), Frank's sister, who is gassed in an attempt to pressure Frank into a confession
- Darren Dolynski as Bill Crothers (season 1), Laura's husband and Frank's brother-in-law, who blames Frank for the death of Laura
- Callum Seagram Airlie as John Crothers (seasons 1–2), Bill and Laura's son, gassed alongside his mother
- Carmen Mikkelsen as Emily Crothers (seasons 1–2), Bill and Laura's daughter, gassed alongside her mother

Nobusuke Tagomi's family

- Yukari Komatsu as Michiko Tagomi (season 2), Nobusuke's wife
- Eddie Shin as Noriaki Tagomi (season 2), Nobusuke and Michiko's son, who is Juliana's husband in a parallel universe
- Tamlyn Tomita as Tamiko Watanabe (seasons 3–4), an Okinawan-Hawaiian painter who befriends Tagomi

Mark Sampson's family

- Yael Yurman as Clara Sampson (seasons 1–3), Mark's daughter
- Ruairi MacDonald as Charlie Sampson (seasons 1–3), Mark's son

==== Neutral Zone ====
- Allan Havey as the Origami Man (season 1), a Sicherheitsdienst (SD) operative sent to Cañon City to eliminate members of the Resistance
- Burn Gorman as the Marshal (season 1), a bounty hunter searching for concentration camp escapees
- Shaun Ross as the Shoe Shine Boy (season 1), a young albino man living in Cañon City
- Rob LaBelle as Carl (season 1), a book store clerk in Cañon City who is revealed to be a concentration camp escapee, David P. Frees
- Geoffrey Blake as Jason Meyer (season 1), a Jewish member of the Resistance
- Shannon Day as Katie Owens (season 1), a woman who stole Juliana's bag at a bus stopover, which contained fake films
- Janet Kidder as Lila Jacobs (season 3), one of the many Jews protected in a Catholic commune in the Neutral Zone, and also Mark Sampson's love interest
- James Neate as Jack (season 3), a man in the Neutral Zone with whom Ed McCarthy becomes romantically involved

==== Resistance ====
- Michael Rispoli as Don Warren (season 1), the manager who gave Joe the mission to go to Cañon City, who is later executed by John Smith
- Geoffery Blake as Jason "Doc" Meyer (season 1), a member of the American resistance working with Don Warren
- Rick Worthy as Lemuel "Lem" Washington, the owner of the Sunrise Diner in Cañon City and member of the Resistance
- Camille Sullivan as Karen Vecchione (seasons 1–2), a leader of the Pacific States branch of the Resistance
- Hank Harris as Randall Becker (season 1), a member of the Pacific States branch of the Resistance
- Cara Mitsuko as Sarah (season 2), a Japanese American Resistance member, Frank's confidante and a survivor of the Manzanar concentration camp
- Tate Donovan as George Dixon (season 2), Trudy's biological father and a member of the resistance in New York City
- Michael Hogan as Hagan (seasons 2–3), an ex-priest and leader in the San Francisco Resistance
- Stephen Root as Hawthorne Abendsen / the Man in the High Castle (seasons 2–4), the head of the American resistance who formerly served the US Army Signal Corps, creating films set in other worlds
- Ann Magnuson as Caroline Abendsen (seasons 3–4), Hawthorne Abendsen's wife
- Clé Bennett as Elijah (season 4), Bell Mallory's lover and one of the members of the BCR
- David Harewood as Equiano Hampton (season 4), the leader of the BCR

==== Historical characters ====
- Wolf Muser as Adolf Hitler (seasons 1–2), the leader of the Greater Nazi Reich
- Ray Proscia as Reinhard Heydrich (seasons 1–2), SS-Oberst-Gruppenführer
- Keone Young as Shunroku Hata (season 1), a field marshal
- Kenneth Tigar as Heinrich Himmler (seasons 2–4), Reichsführer-SS and later the new Führer
- Lisa Paxton as Eva Braun (season 2), Hitler's wife
- David Furr as George Lincoln Rockwell (season 3), the Reichsmarschall of German-controlled America
- William Forsythe as J. Edgar Hoover (seasons 3–4), the director of the American Reich Bureau of Investigation (the counterpart of the Federal Bureau of Investigation)
- John Hans Tester as Josef Mengele (seasons 3–4), the head of studies about trans-universe travel
- Gwynyth Walsh as Margarete Himmler (season 4), Himmler's wife and the head of the Reich Red Cross
- Timothy V. Murphy as Adolf Eichmann (season 4), SS-Oberst-Gruppenführer
- Hiromoto Ida as Hirohito (season 4), the Japanese emperor

== Episodes ==
Season	Episodes		Originally released
1	10	1	January 15, 2015
1	10	9	November 20, 2015
2	10		December 16, 2016
3	10		October 5, 2018
4	10		November 15, 2019

=== Season 1 (2015) ===
No. overall	No. in season	Title	Directed by	Written by	Original release date
1	1	"The New World"	David Semel	Frank Spotnitz	January 15, 2015
In 1962 Nazi-occupied New York, Joe Blake volunteers to serve the resistance by driving a truck to the Neutral Zone in the Rockies. In Japan-occupied San Francisco, Juliana Crain receives a package from her sister, Trudy, only to see her shot seconds later by the Japanese police. Juliana discovers the package contains impossible footage of the Allies winning World War II. Her boyfriend, Frank, urges her to go to the police to plead her innocence. However, Juliana lies to him and instead heads to the Neutral Zone to deliver the film in Trudy's place. The Japanese trade minister, Nobusuke Tagomi, meets the Nazi ambassador Hugo Reiss to finalize the details of a visit to San Francisco by the Japanese Crown Prince. Later Tagomi meets Rudolph Wegener, a high-ranking Nazi official pretending to be a Swedish businessman. Joe and Juliana meet and become friends in Canon City in the Neutral Zone. In San Francisco, the Kempeitai begin searching for Juliana because of her connection to Trudy. Joe calls SS Obergruppenführer Smith, revealing himself as an SS agent.
2	2	"Sunrise"	Daniel Percival	Frank Spotnitz	November 20, 2015
In San Francisco, the Kempeitai arrest Frank to find out the whereabouts of Juliana. They pressure him by putting his sister and her children into a gas chamber. He was to be executed by the firing squad but was let go when fake film reels stolen from Juliana turn up; however, his sister and her children were gassed to death. Working in a Canon City diner, Juliana meets the Origami Man, who she assumes is her contact, but who is actually an undercover SD agent. Despite being ordered not to interfere, Joe follows Juliana to her meeting the agent to help her. Juliana is able to throw the Origami Man over a railing to his death. In New York, Smith is ambushed by resistance fighters in an assassination attempt; he survives, but his aide Raeder is seriously wounded.
3	3	"The Illustrated Woman"	Ken Olin	Thomas Schnauz and Evan Wright	November 20, 2015
Joe encounters a Nazi-allied bounty hunter known as the Marshal, who is looking for the SD agent Juliana killed. Joe and Juliana dispose of the dead agent's body and car and find a map which leads them to a cave where they find a dead woman and a list of names. The list reveals that Juliana's boss from the diner was her actual contact. The Marshal realizes Juliana's true identity and tries to kill her. In San Francisco, the Japanese Crown Prince arrives in the city. Tagomi tells Wegener to secretly contact Japanese Science Minister Shimura, during the Crown Prince's speech at the Nazi Embassy. Frank breaks the news of his sister and her children's deaths to his brother-in-law and returns to work, where he makes a real gun.
4	4	"Revelations"	Michael Rymer	Thomas Schnauz and Jace Richdale	November 20, 2015
Joe saves Juliana from the Marshal. In the woods, Joe and Juliana are surrounded by resistance fighters and forced to give up the films. They are attacked again by the Marshal, who pursues Juliana on the highway. She burns her car and hides and the Marshal assumes her dead. Back in New York, Smith suspects that SS Hauptsturmfuhrer Connolly supplied information about his movements to the resistance. In the Pacific States, Frank heads to the Crown Prince's speech with a gun to assassinate him but hesitates. The Crown Prince is then shot by an unseen sniper.
5	5	"The New Normal"	Bryan Spicer	Rob Williams	November 20, 2015
Wegener is unable to plant a microfilm capsule in the Science Minister's pocket and is detained as a foreigner due to the shooting. The Crown Prince is rushed to the hospital after the attack, and the captain of the Imperial Guard commits seppuku for failing to protect the Crown Prince. Kido then states that if he cannot find the gunman, he will do the same. Juliana returns home to find an angry Frank, who alludes to his time in prison. Juliana visits her parents and learns that the Japanese killed Frank's sister and children. When she later reports to the Japanese military, she is interrogated and asked about Trudy's partner, Randall, but is ultimately let go. Joe returns to New York from the Neutral Zone and is taken by Gestapo agents to Smith's office. He reports on the events in Canon City, though his report is contradicted by the Marshal's. Smith tells Joe he has failed but invites him to celebrate Victory in America (VA) Day with the Smith family.
6	6	"Three Monkeys"	Nelson McCormick	Rob Williams	November 20, 2015
Joe celebrates VA Day at Smith's house. Wegener, transferring through New York on his way back from the Pacific States, is intercepted by Smith; the two are old friends, but Smith has received intelligence about Wegener's treasonous activities. Juliana accepts a job working for Tagomi as she continues her search for answers, later discovering that her stepfather Arnold is working for the Japanese. Smith has Wegener arrested at the end of the evening after he fails to confess or even allude to his mission. Joe attempts to look through Smith's private files, but is caught in the act.
7	7	"Truth"	Brad Anderson	Emma Frost	November 20, 2015
Smith, having caught Joe in his home office, interrogates him further about Juliana and Canon City and threatens him with execution if he does not recover a newly-discovered film from the Man in the High Castle.
8	8	"End of the World"	Karyn Kusama	Walon Green	November 20, 2015
Juliana and Frank make plans to escape the Pacific States, only to be dragged back into danger by Joe, who tries to retrieve a new film and walks directly into a Kempeitai ambush. Smith is informed by Dr. Adler, his family physician, that Thomas has been diagnosed with a rare type of muscular dystrophy and must be euthanized to conform to Nazi health laws. Reinhard Heydrich, now an Oberst-Gruppenführer in the Reich, visits Smith and takes Wegener from Smith's custody for his own purposes.
9	9	"Kindness"	Michael Slovis	Jace Richdale	November 20, 2015
Smith discovers that Heydrich was behind the attempt on his life and kills Connolly, who had arranged the ambush on Heydrich's orders. Frank and Juliana, after taking possession of the new film, decide to watch it, but they are shocked to find out that the film depicts, apparently in the near future, a nuclear-bombed San Francisco in which the SS round up and execute survivors. Frank is shown being executed by Joe, who is wearing an SS uniform. Heydrich coerces Wegener into an assassination attempt on Hitler, promising him that his family's lives will be spared if he co-operates.
10	10	"A Way Out"	Daniel Percival	Rob Williams	November 20, 2015
Frank and Juliana angrily confront Joe as a Nazi agent. He goes to the Nazi embassy with the film. Smith learns that Heydrich is preparing a trap. Kido acts on information from the Yakuza and kills the Nazi sniper who shot the Crown Prince. Ed is caught with Frank's gun and is used as a scapegoat for the attempted assassination of the Crown Prince, to avoid the need for Kido to commit seppuku. Heydrich demands Smith's loyalty ahead of Wegener's assassination of Hitler. Wegener says goodbye to his family and travels to Hitler's alpine castle. However, after confronting Hitler, who informs him that Heydrich's cohort will attack Japan if he is assassinated – likely leading to the deaths of millions – Wegener kills himself instead. Smith captures the traitor Heydrich and reports him to Hitler. Tagomi goes to Union Square to meditate with Juliana's charm. He opens his eyes to find himself in an alternate 1962, in which the Allies won World War II and the United States is in the midst of the Cuban Missile Crisis.

=== Season 2 (2016) ===
No. overall	No. in season	Title	Directed by	Written by	Original release date
11	1	"The Tiger's Cave"	Daniel Percival	Frank Spotnitz	December 16, 2016
Joe returns to New York to hand over the film to Smith and submits his resignation but Smith refuses to accept the resignation before he delivers the film to Hitler. Karen and Lem confront Juliana for not leading Joe into an ambush before she is tranquilized. She wakes up in the home of Hawthorne Abendsen, the Man in the High Castle, where he keeps his vast film collection. General Onoda reveals to Tagomi and his staff that the capsule that Science Minister Shimura found in his pocket contained plans for a nuclear weapon that the Empire intends to use to crush the Nazis, much to Tagomi's dismay, who had hoped to balance the power between the two empires. Frank confronts Arnold about spying on his own family. Desperate to save Ed, Frank goes to ask Childan for help. Juliana attempts to get answers from an evasive Abendsen and receives a clue that may help avert the nuclear war. Gary Connell, the leader of the West Coast Resistance, goes against orders and tries to kill Juliana but she escapes at a Kempeitai checkpoint. A gunfight ensues between the Resistance members and the Japanese soldiers and Karen is killed in the crossfire.
12	2	"The Road Less Traveled"	Colin Bucksey	Rob Williams	December 16, 2016
Kido investigates the shooting at the checkpoint and suspects that Juliana is involved. Frank decides to get Paul Kasoura, a defense lawyer, to help Ed. In desperation, he reveals to Kasoura that the antique goods that he and Childan sold him are fake, leading the pair to be imprisoned by the Yakuza with whom Kasoura has a connection. Frank manages to convince Okamura to allow him to repay his debt for the forgery if Ed is allowed to work with him as his assistant. Kido is forced by Okamura to release Ed. He later pins the attempted assassination of the Crown Prince on the deceased Karen. Joe is ordered by Smith to visit his father, Reichsminister Heusmann in Berlin. Smith tells Joe that Juliana is possibly dead. Juliana evades Gary and Lem, then tries to convince her parents to leave San Francisco, to no avail. Using the clue about a familiar man on whom Abendsen is fixated, Juliana discovers from her mother that the man, George Dixon, her father's friend, is her sister Trudy's real father. Learning that he may be in Brooklyn and fleeing the Kempeitai, Juliana requests asylum at the Nazi embassy and leaves a letter to Frank.
13	3	"Travelers"	Daniel Sackheim	Erik Oleson	December 16, 2016
Smith is warned by Dr. Adler that he cannot postpone Thomas' euthanization any further, and must do it himself to prevent Nazi authorities from doing it. Juliana makes it to New York and is questioned by Smith, who is notified of her arrival and arranges for her to stay. He keeps this a secret from Joe. Frank learns of Juliana's defection to the Nazi states but does not believe Gary about her betrayal. While he works with Ed and Childan to create forgeries for the Yakuza to repay his debt, Frank is convinced by the Resistance to help them liberate citizens rounded up by Kempeitai for retaliation of the checkpoint murders. While saving Resistance member Sarah, Frank kills a Japanese soldier. Juliana looks for Joe but is told by his ex-lover that he has rejoined the Nazis, leading her to think he may have betrayed her. Joe travels to Berlin and meets with his father but is distant because of Heusmann's treatment of Joe's mother. Joe crosses paths with Nicole Dörmer, a film maker. Smith is unable to inject his son when he is given the chance to kill him; he instead meets with Dr. Adler and kills him instead to silence him.
14	4	"Escalation"	David Petrarca	Wesley Strick	December 16, 2016
Juliana adjusts to life in the Reich, under the tutelage of Smith's wife Helen and his son Thomas. While looking for Dixon at his old apartment, she is pursued by two unknown agents and nearly killed. General Onoda has the Kempeitai kill numerous citizens for the murder of the Japanese soldiers during the Resistance rescue. Enraged, Frank starts to neglect his debt with the Yakuza and accepts a risky assignment to siphon materials from an unexploded Japanese bomb for a Resistance mission, much to Ed's dismay. Frank begins to get close with Sarah during the assignment. Smith reveals to a suspicious Helen that he killed Dr. Adler to keep their son's illness a secret. Kido gets Onoda drunk and tricks him into approving an unknown order. After escaping from her pursuers, Juliana is approached by George Dixon. Tagomi travels to the alternate timeline once again and visits his wife, Michiko, who is deceased in his timeline.
15	5	"Duck and Cover"	John Fawcett	Erik Oleson & Rick Cleveland	December 16, 2016
George Dixon, who is actually a Resistance leader, meets up with Juliana after she tells him that the Man in the High Castle sent her. Juliana says he may be involved in the possible San Francisco bombing, as he has repeatedly appeared in the films. Dixon forces Juliana to spy on Smith and his family to redeem her perceived betrayal when she allowed Joe to escape with the film. Joe is upset when his father brings him to his place of birth and reveals that he is one of the Lebensborn, an experiment to perfect racial purity. He takes up his father's offer to remain in Berlin for a few more days. Kido attempts to use Onoda's approval to extradite Juliana from the Nazi states but fails and reveals his motive for visiting Smith. Frank becomes further involved with the Resistance and Ed is revealed to be a Kempeitai informer to report on the Yakuza's counterfeiting activities in exchange for his and Frank's lives. Lem assists Abendsen move house because the location of the High Castle may have been compromised. Abendsen destroys most of the films before he leaves. Tagomi reveals himself to his alternate wife Michiko and his son Noriyuke but discovers that the alternate Tagomi's relationship with them is estranged. He is shocked to see Noriyuke, married to an alternate Juliana with their son.
16	6	"Kintsugi"	Paul Holahan	Francesca Gardiner	December 16, 2016
Juliana starts to socialize with the Ladies Committee as planned and gains the support of one of its members, Lucy. Helen discovers that Thomas has been selected by the Hitler Youth group to go for an expedition in South America. She forbids her son to go until she finds out that Smith arranged to have their son disappear from society by staging a fake abduction and living a life of anonymity. Joe starts to get closer to Nicole, who reveals herself as one of the Lebensborn and brings him to meet with some of the others. After spending the night with Nicole, Joe begins to embrace his real heritage. Tagomi attempts to mend his alternate self's relationship with his family and is dismayed by the alternate Noriyuke's forgoing of the Japanese culture. Kido is informed by his right-hand man Yoshida that Abendsen's burnt hideout has been found and learns that the Yakuza is also looking for the films.
17	7	"Land O' Smiles"	Karyn Kusama	Rob Williams	December 16, 2016
Ed and Childan go to Okamura to repay their debt with the sale from Frank's forgery but are locked up in a storage room when Kido and his men pay Okamura an unannounced visit. Kido shoots Okamura and the other Yakuza members present for treason, as he has deduced the Yakuza to be working with the Nazis. Yoshida discovers Ed and Childan but lets them go. Frank is sent to plant a bomb at the harbor where General Onoda is visiting, but aborts the mission when he discovers that the Japanese are secretly building a nuclear bomb there. He informs the resistance of his findings. At Adler's funeral, Smith is alarmed when Adler's wife, Alice, raises her suspicion about her husband's sudden death and suggests an autopsy be performed. Juliana also attends the funeral and covers for Thomas when he has a brief seizure. Later, she promises Helen not to reveal Thomas' condition. Himmler informs Smith that Hitler has suffered a collapse.
18	8	"Loose Lips"	Alex Zakrzewski	Rick Cleveland	December 16, 2016
Smith questions Juliana at her apartment about Joe's film and learns of San Francisco's impending destruction. Lucy tells Juliana that she knows that the supposedly live footage of Hitler is actually archival because her husband managed the television broadcast. Juliana shares with George Dixon her belief that Hitler may be dead. The Resistance decides that it is time to stage an uprising. Juliana is left concerned that she may have caused the nuclear catastrophe that she has been trying to prevent. Heusmann is made Acting Chancellor and Joe decides to support his father. Frank learns from Arnold that Juliana has warned them to leave San Francisco and has not betrayed him. Enraged, he confronts Gary Connell but the Resistance is determined to go ahead with the uprising. Armed with the knowledge from Juliana and Kido, Smith misleads an imprisoned Heydrich into thinking Germany and Japan are already at war, which leads Heydrich to confirm what Smith has suspected, a conspiracy to create a pretext for war with and extermination of the Japanese. Smith executes Heydrich after learning from him that it is Heusmann who is the mastermind behind the rush to war and who is to be the new chancellor. Hitler dies and Heusmann becomes chancellor.
19	9	"Detonation"	Chris Long	Wesley Strick	December 16, 2016
Tagomi watches a film with his alternate family on the recent test detonation of a hydrogen bomb at Bikini Atoll. Finally resolved to stop war between Japan and the Nazis, Tagomi takes the film and returns to his reality. When Thomas confronts Juliana to learn about his condition, their conversation is secretly being recorded. Smith later learns of the tape and takes it to protect Thomas' secret. In a televised address, Heusmann frames the Japanese for Hitler's death by poison and promises retaliation, much to Joe's horror. Frank decides to assist the Resistance in assassinating Onoda by using their homemade bombs. Before the operation, he convinces Ed and Childan to leave San Francisco. Ed had a flashback to when he, Frank and Juliana first gathered near the bay of San Francisco. Frank and Sarah smuggle a car bomb into the underground parking garage of the Kempeitai. They set the bomb's timer and attempt to leave the building but they are spotted by Kido and shots are exchanged in the lobby. Just as Tagomi arrives, the bomb detonates, killing Yoshida, General Onoda and his staff and collapsing most of the building. Kido survived the blast. The fates of Frank and Sarah are not shown.
20	10	"Fallout"	Daniel Percival	Erik Oleson	December 16, 2016
Tagomi also turns out to have survived the bombing. Afterwards, Kido travels to New York and plays the film (from an alternate Earth) for Smith that appears to provide evidence that the Japanese have a hydrogen bomb. The resistance attempts to avenge Karen's death by killing Juliana but she escapes. She then confronts and kills George Dixon who was threatening to expose Smith by broadcasting the tape of her conversation with Thomas. Smith travels to Berlin with the film to convince his Nazi superiors not to attack Japan so as to avoid nuclear retaliation. Smith meets privately with Himmler to expose Heusmann as a traitor. After arresting Heusmann and Joe, Himmler addresses the worldwide public from the Volkshalle, appearing to assume control of the Reich. He publicly praises Smith for his service. The recognition that Smith receives inspires Thomas to turn himself over to the Public Health Department to be euthanized. After traveling to the Neutral Zone, a bereft Juliana learns from Abendsen that hope remains and that her sister is alive. Lem hands over Abendsen's remaining films to Tagomi.

=== Season 3 (2018) ===
No. overall	No. in season	Title	Directed by	Written by	Original release date
21	1	"Now More Than Ever, We Care About You"	Daniel Percival	Wesley Strick	October 5, 2018
In Berlin, in the fall of 1962, Joe Blake and his father are imprisoned in solitary confinement; both have been tortured and brainwashed. Himmler forces Joe to execute his father to prove his loyalty. Trudy is in Jamestown, Colorado, with Hawthorne Abendsen and his wife and is being cared for by Juliana. Abendsen tells Juliana that her destiny is to replace him. Juliana wants to know how she will die but Abendsen still refuses to tell her. Later that night Abendsen and his wife are attacked by Nazis, prompting them to leave Jamestown. As they part ways, Abendsen tells Juliana to ask Tagomi how she dies because Abendsen sent Tagomi the remaining films. John Smith has been promoted to Oberst-Gruppenführer (Nazi equivalent of four-star general) and has just returned to New York City from Berlin. There is tension between him and his wife because of the death of their son, who is honored in a special public ceremony. Nicole Dörmer moves to New York to work in the Ministry of Propaganda and Joe Blake is posted by Himmler to the San Francisco embassy, as deputy trade attaché, Joseph Cinnadella. Joe Blake kills Erich Raeder.
22	2	"Imagine Manchuria"	Alex Zakrzewski	Eric Overmyer	October 5, 2018
Juliana realizes that Tagomi is a "traveler". Himmler and John Smith send spies to the neutral zone to find someone code-named "lotus eater". Admiral Inokuchi discusses with Tagomi that the GNR is covertly limiting access by the Japanese Pacific States to oil supplies, leading to serious fuel shortages. Tagomi meets Tamiko Watanabe for the first time. Hoover tells Rockwell that he knows of the hereditary health problem of Smith's son, that Smith violated rules by neither reporting nor acting on it and that he suspects Smith killed Dr. Adler. Kido captures Juliana and Trudy and is perplexed because he killed the other Trudy. Kotomichi tells Tagomi of the arrest. Admiral Inokuchi tells Kido to release Trudy and Juliana into Tagomi's custody. Trudy returns to her own world. Helen Smith visits Mrs. Adler in her home, is attacked and kills her in self-defense. Joe Blake meets Ambassador Weber, who gives him his assignment. His task is to find Oberführer Diels, who had previously defected to San Francisco.
23	3	"Sensō Kōi"	Ernest Dickerson	Chris Collins	October 5, 2018
Juliana watches a film in which she is shot by Joe Blake, who then kills himself. This vision leads her to believe that the Lackawanna coal mine in Pennsylvania is the key to understanding the film. In San Francisco, Joe Blake kills Diels. His next targets are Howard Wexler, another defector from the Reich and Nobusuke Tagomi. Joe re-encounters Juliana. John Smith learns of the travelers and alternative worlds and of the research by Mengele on Project "Nebenwelt", which aims to enable movement between worlds. He later views some of Hitler's film archive and discovers Thomas alive in another world. Tamiko gives Tagomi a gift of one of her paintings. Hagan is captured and tortured by Kido and reveals that Frank Frink is alive.
24	4	"Sabra"	John Fawcett	Eric Simonson	October 5, 2018
A disabled Frank Frink resurfaces in a Catholic enclave, St Theresa's, in the neutral zone. He is the source of the rising sun artwork that is being used by the Resistance across the Pacific States. Joe Blake finds Wexler, kills him, and steals his briefcase that contains details of the Nazis' Nebenwelt plans. John Smith learns that Erich Raeder has been killed. Kido asks the new Yakuza boss, Okami, to find Frank Frink. In return, Kido promises to ask the trade minister to reverse the empire's policy on black market oil. Childan wants to return to San Francisco, but Ed wants to stay with Jack. They get ambushed in their van by bikers and robbed. Nakamura leaves details for Joe Blake of Kido's monitoring of Tagomi, under a table in a café. Wyatt visits Juliana and tells her his name is Liam. He gives her a number to call to reach him. Nicole Dörmer and Thelma Harris begin an affair. John Smith has a dream, where he sees Thomas and Rudolph Wegener.
25	5	"The New Colossus"	Daniel Percival	Wesley Strick	October 5, 2018
Joe tries to kill Tagomi but a passer-by forces him to abandon the attempt. Hoover tells Reichsmarschall Rockwell that Smith was planning to stage an abduction of his son and hide him in South America to stop Thomas being euthanised. He also believes that he can obtain evidence that Helen Smith killed Mrs. Adler. Hoover visits Helen Smith and tells her that the confession to Mrs. Adler's murder was coerced. Helen admits that she visited Mrs. Adler and argued with her. Smith visits Hoover, who tells him early retirement is the only way to avoid scandal, or worse. Smith then shows Hoover a file on him that is in Smith's possession, as leverage. Himmler orders Smith to a meeting with him, Hoover and Rockwell, who calls him out on the suspicious circumstances of the Adlers' deaths, as well as Smith's plan to move his son to South America. Rockwell accuses Smith of treason based on Hoover's evidence. Hoover has hidden the evidence condemning Smith and refuses to corroborate Rockwell's claims. Himmler condemns Rockwell as a traitor and he is forced to stand down and go into exile; he is later murdered at Smith's behest. Himmler promotes Smith to Reichsmarschall. Juliana discovers Blake's files on Tagomi and Wexler's files on project "Nebenwelt" in Lackawanna. At gunpoint, Joe Blake tells her that "Die Nebenwelt" will ensure that the Nazis take over every parallel world and he expects her to join him. She slashes his throat and absconds with the plans.
26	6	"History Ends"	Meera Menon	Elizabeth Benjamin and Kalen Egan	October 5, 2018
Mingus Jones and his men sell "Zed", an amphetamine, to Wyatt/Liam, who pays a meager price. Juliana asks Wyatt/Liam for help in getting the Nebenwelt files to Tagomi. Afterwards they set off for the neutral zone. Kido identifies Juliana as a suspect in Blake's death. Tagomi shows the stolen files to Kido, who sees that they originated in the Kempeitai. Kido confronts Nakamura, as he had passed them on to Joe. Reichsmarshall Smith interviews a woman from a parallel world who vanishes before his eyes. Himmler sends a Lebensborn marksman, Hans, to finish Blake's task with regard to Tagomi. Sampson runs into Ed McCarthy in a bar and tells him that Frank Frink is alive. Ed and Childan part ways. Ed is reunited with Frank and witnesses his bar mitzvah. Wyatt and Juliana reach Denver. Lem brings Juliana to the Abendsens.
27	7	"Excess Animus"	Steph Green	Dre Ryan	October 5, 2018
Nakamura is executed as a traitor. Juliana tells Abendsen about Lackawanna and the Nebenwelt project. She wants to return to the Reich to try to thwart their plans. Wyatt brings her to St Theresa's, where she discovers Frank and Ed. Childan returns to his store and finds that the locks have been changed. He overreacts and is arrested and interrogated by Kido. Smith speaks with Himmler and asks why the Reich wants to kill Tagomi. Himmler says this plan has been rescinded. Smith continues to watch Hitler's film archive and is increasingly disturbed by what he sees. Tagomi meets with Kido and tells him about the Nebenwelt project and that Juliana is trying to stop it from happening.
28	8	"Kasumi (Through the Mists)"	Jennifer Getzinger	William N. Fordes	October 5, 2018
The GNR continues to destroy all historical monuments related to US history. Juliana shows the film of the Allies' victory in WW2 to the residents of St. Theresa's. A physicist tells her that the Nebenwelt blueprint is for a quantum transfer device. If it fails, it will cause an explosion the size of a small atomic blast. Juliana says in her memory there was an explosion in the tunnel and the device might have been blown up by someone. Helen Smith has developed feelings for her psychiatrist and makes a pass at him that is rebuffed. He informs Smith. Wyatt buys new papers for Juliana. He suspects that the seller is a Nazi informer and kills him. He brings the papers to Juliana and meets Frank, who is suspicious of his motives. Wyatt tells Juliana that the Nazis killed half his family in Ireland. Sampson confronts Wyatt for dealing with a Nazi informer. Juliana leaves with Wyatt for Lackawanna. Kido removes the squatters from Childan's store and allows him to move back in in recognition for his services to the Japanese Pacific States. Tagomi is attacked by the Lebensborn marksman and defends himself using aikido. Kido goes to the neutral zone to find Frank.
29	9	"Baku"	Deborah Chow	Chris Collins and Chris Wu	October 5, 2018
Smith watches a film of himself in civilian clothing with his wife and son watching a speech by Martin Luther King. Major Metzger reports to Smith that Wyatt and Juliana killed border guards at an entry point to the GNR. Tagomi phones Smith to request a meeting in the neutral zone to discuss the oil embargo and Nebenwelt. Himmler tells him to go. Smith chooses Highcastle's farm house as the meeting location. At the house, he finds a photo of Abendsen that he recognizes from a film. Tagomi tells him that he was the source of the H-bomb film that Smith used to prevent war in the previous year. He asks him to help him maintain peace. Helen Smith tells her friends Mary Dawson and Lucy Collins about Goebbels' foot deformity and says that those at the top in Berlin are protected. Jennifer's health tests are imminent. Wyatt and Juliana reach Chicago and show the film to Resistance operatives. She tells them about the Nebenwelt device. Ed and Frank paint the rising sun logo in highly visible locations in Denver. Kido finds and executes Frank. Wyatt and Juliana arrive in Lackawanna in the Poconos. Smith captures Abendsen's wife.
30	10	"Jahr Null"	Daniel Percival	Eric Overmyer and Wesley Strick	October 5, 2018
Smith arrests Abendsen and leaves for Poconos, where he meets Himmler. Juliana and resistance fighters enter the Lackawanna mine. Their presence is discovered. Juliana is captured. Mengele uses the Nebenwelt device to open the portal and send four captives into the anomaly. Three die, one vanishes. Himmler is delighted. He lifts the oil embargo so that Japan will not hinder the further development of the Nebenwelt device. Smith discovers that Abendsen's real name is Abe Hawkes. In WW2 they fought on the same side. Helen has gone into hiding with her daughters. Himmler opens Jahr Null ('year zero') with the destruction of the Statue of Liberty. Pro and anti-Nazi youths rampage in the streets and Himmler proposes a purge. He is hit by a sniper, aided by Wyatt. Ed and Jack visit Childan and tell him about Frank. Together they hang a huge rising sun banner from Coit Tower in San Francisco. Abendsen tells Smith that the only way for a person to move to a parallel world is if their equivalent is already dead in the other place. Juliana travels to another world in front of Smith, who shoots her as she disappears.

=== Season 4 (2019) ===
No. overall	No. in season	Title	Directed by	Written by	Original release date
31	1	"Hexagram 64"	Daniel Percival	Wesley Strick	November 15, 2019
As she is shot by John Smith, Juliana crosses to alt-world and collapses before the car of alt-Smith and Thomas. Later, she works as an aikido teacher and befriends Russ Gilmore and the Smith family. During meditation she sees Tagomi in a vision. He leaves her a message by means of Wei-Chi. In the JPS/GNR world, Tagomi is assassinated, leading to violent reprisals through the Pacific States. The Kempeitai arrest Mingus Jones under suspicion of assassinating Tagomi. The violence of the arrest and subsequent interrogation distresses Kido's son, Toru. Helen Smith and her children are now living in the Neutral Zone with her brother, Hank McCrae, who is not a Nazi. The GNR besieges Denver. John Smith takes his children back to New York without Helen. The resistance fighters' munitions are running low. Wyatt, now their leader meets with members of the Black Communist Rebellion (BCR).
32	2	"Every Door Out..."	Nelson McCormick	Julie Hébert	November 15, 2019
The Nebenwelt device now enables movement of Nazi agents between worlds. Smith learns of his other self and that Juliana lives in that world. Wyatt proposes to join forces with the BCR. BCR leader Bell Mallory suggest attacking General Masuda, Inspector Kido and defence ministers Shimura and Nagasaki during an auction of American memorabilia hosted by Childan. In return the BCR will give him the weaponry that the resistance urgently needs. Wyatt's fighters mask as catering for Childan's auction. Childan meets the Crown Princess; his life's dream fulfilled when she describes him as a man of culture. Jennifer confesses to a school friend, Henry, that she was in the Neutral Zone rather than in Chicago. She plays for him a banned blues record. Amy hears it, walks in on them and takes the record to report it to their father. Smith protects Jennifer by telling Amy that the record was evidence in an investigation and that Amy should consider the incident reported. Jennifer contacts her mother, tearfully saying that she wants to return to the Neutral Zone and be with her.
33	3	"The Box"	John Fawcett	Kalen Egan	November 15, 2019
Juliana meets Russ and borrows a gun from him, having realised that she is being watched. Kido tells General Yamori that Mingus Jones had an alibi. Yamori tells him to make Mingus the culprit nonetheless. Toru Kido is suffering from post-traumatic stress disorder following his involvement in Masuda's campaign in Manchuria. He tells his father that the empire is losing in China and that they are both puppets, for which he is thrown out and disowned by his father. As a result, Kido does not attend the auction. The attack proceeds anyway, with Shimura, Nagasaki and Masuda being killed. Wyatt loses several men. Childan, having unwittingly been taken prisoner by the BCR, tells them that the Crown Princess was planning to withdraw from the JPS and that they have killed the wrong people. The auction was a cover for a summit meeting about the withdrawal. Juliana seeks advice from alt-Smith about his core drive. When leaving, Juliana is ambushed, but is saved by alt-Smith, who is killed in the process. His killer, a Nazi agent, recognizes him.
34	4	"Happy Trails"	Rachel Leiterman	Mark Richard	November 15, 2019
Abendsen is being coerced into hosting Tales from the High Castle, a Nazi propaganda anthology depicting an Allied victory dystopia. In return, they keep his wife safe. Juliana goes to the Lincoln Memorial in Washington DC and travels back to the JPS/GNR world. She tries to pay for bread with US dollars in a bakery owned by Zina Parks. She takes refuge there while waiting for Wyatt. Obergruppenführer Goertzmann visits Reichsmarshall Smith and issues a veiled warning. Himmler, who survived the sniper attack, attends a dinner at Smith's home and appears in poor health and cantankerous. Helen is treated with unmasked suspicion by his wife, Margarethe. Childan, in the custody of the BCR, contacts the Crown Princess on their behalf and offers a temporary ceasefire in exchange for peace talks. General Yamori authorizes Kido to conduct reprisals in contradiction of Admiral Inokuchi's instructions. Kido tells Captain Iijima that he knows he murdered Tagomi. John Smith learns of his death in the other world and that Juliana is back.
35	5	"Mauvaise Foi"	Charlotte Brändström	David Scarpa	November 15, 2019
Equiano Hampton, Bell and Elijah meet with Admiral Inokuchi. Hampton tells him the BCR wants a free state for Blacks. The meeting is ambushed by the Kempeitai. Hampton is killed and Inokuchi is arrested for high treason. The Kempeitai begin a raid on the ghettos where the BCR are hiding. Childan is allowed to escape. He returns home and finds his place has been ransacked and learns that the Kempeitai are looking for him. Wyatt and Juliana start planning a new offensive with resistance members. Smith travels to the other world. He finds that the alt-Helen is still in love with him. He is overwhelmed to meet Thomas again, but Thomas accuses him of hypocrisy when he tries to convince him not to join the Marines. He is devastated when he meets the alt-version of his friend Daniel Levine, whom in his own world he let be sent to his death along with other Jewish US soldiers after he joined the Nazis in 1946.
36	6	"All Serious Daring"	Julie Hébert	Lolis Eric Elie	November 15, 2019
Smith's 48 hours in the alt-world are nearly over. Before he leaves, he discovers that Thomas has signed up for the Marines and the war in Vietnam. Smith returns to the GNR world and seeks out Abendsen to find out what the repercussions would be of him intervening in the alt-world to save Thomas. Juliana believes that Abendsen's propaganda monologues contain hidden messages. She decides to approach Helen Smith for help in stopping Reichsmarshall Smith. Toru Kido has taken up residence in an opium house owned by the Yakuza. Inspector Kido interrogates Admiral Inokuchi, who keeps his promise to the Crown Princess not to reveal her involvement in the covert peace talks with the BCR. When the Crown Princess demands his release, General Yamori places her under house arrest and opens Inokuchi's court-martial. He is sentenced to death for killing Trade Minister Tagomi. Kido, charged with executing Inokuchi, turns on General Yamori and arrests him for the murder of Tagomi. Bell Mallory starts planning new tactical operations to destroy the "crimson pipeline" that supplies oil to the JPS.
37	7	"No Masters But Ourselves"	Richard Heus	Wesley Strick	November 15, 2019
The BCR starts planting bombs along the crimson pipeline, oil tankers, and official JPS buildings. Smith's agent, Campbell, tells him that the war in Vietnam in the alt-world will be brief due to the martial and technological superiority of the USA. Campbell is ordered to monitor Thomas in the alt-world. Mrs. Himmler visits Helen and offers more veiled threats. Helen asks what she can do to regain the goodwill of the Reich, and subsequently appears on a live TV show for housewives. She switches on the charm and her appearance is a success. Henry Iver kisses Jennifer Smith in the park. She is overheard telling him that her mother's perfect wife behavior is all an act. The Kempeitai arrests Childan. Kido wants him to provide the names of the members of the BCR. Childan reveals names and, due to his pro-Japanese sentiments, is allowed to leave. The BCR attacks cause major infrastructural damage. Bell claims responsibility in the name of the BCR and says they will not stop until they have their own homeland. Kido admits to the Crown Princess that he does not think that the JPS is worth fighting for. The Japanese Emperor orders the withdrawal of his forces from the JPS.
38	8	"Hitler Has Only Got One Ball"	Frederick E.O. Toye	Jihan Crowther	November 15, 2019
With Japan's withdrawal, John Smith sees an opportunity to unite the entirety of the former USA under the authority of the Reich. The BCR will govern the Pacific States independently. Japanese citizens are being evacuated. Inokuchi wants Kido and the Kempeitai to leave on the last ships departing for Japan. Kido sends his men home but stays behind. Kido is kidnapped by American vigilantes but the BCR prevents the planned lynching. They unwittingly lock him up in the room he used to kill Frank Frink's sister and her children. The Crown Princess sends Childan a letter of transit to Japan. He proposes to his assistant/girlfriend Yukiko, which she accepts. Abendsen's wife commits suicide and he attempts to do the same. Juliana approaches Helen Smith in a department store. She tells her that Thomas is alive and Smith knows where he is. Hoover presents Smith with plans of universal surveillance to prevent the developing American nationalism. Smith is summoned to Berlin, accompanied by Goertzmann. General Whitcroft tells Smith that Hoover is gathering information on John's family. He suggests that North America try to break free from Berlin.
39	9	"For Want of a Nail"	John Fawcett	Mark Richard and David Scarpa	November 15, 2019
Reich aircraft drop propaganda flyers over the Pacific states. In Berlin, Smith meets General Eichmann, who makes sure he learns that he is not included in strategic discussions hosted by Reichsführer Himmler about invading the Pacific States. Juliana dreams about a major event happening at the Nebenwelt portal. Childan is denied permission to board the ship for Japan and insists that Yukiko travel without him. Helen finds Smith's films of Thomas and herself in the alt-world. She contacts Juliana, who tells her that she will know when Smith is planning to go to the portal because he always travels there by train. Himmler's inner circle argues that a German should head the invasion of the Pacific States and the new North American Reich. Himmler questions Smith's true loyalties. Hoover gives his report on the Smith family and reveals their skepticism about the Reich. In private, Himmler tells Smith he regarded him as the son he never had. Smith tells him that he despises him and kills him in his chambers, while Goertzmann kills the inner circle. Goertzmann becomes Reichsführer of all GNR states outside of North America and Smith becomes Reichsführer of an autonomous North American Reich.
40	10	"Fire from the Gods"	Daniel Percival	David Scarpa	November 15, 2019
John Smith's family disintegrates as Amy and Jennifer, pro- and anti-Nazi respectively, are both sent to the Neutral Zone by Helen, who, discovering that John plans to exterminate 14 million people in the Pacific States, informs the Resistance of Smith's presence on a train to the Poconos base. Kido, with his son being threatened by the Yakuza, agrees to cooperate with them in exchange for his son's safety. As the American Reich prepares for an invasion, Helen confronts her husband on board the train; he, in turn, attempts to convince Helen to adopt the Thomas from the other reality to save him from conscription and eventual death in the Vietnam War. However, resistance members bomb the train and Helen is killed; Smith escapes alone but is apprehended by Juliana and kills himself. The invasion of the Pacific States is halted by Smith's second-in-command, General Whitcroft, just as North American Reich forces are about to begin the invasion. As Juliana arrives inside the Poconos base once again, the resistance members watch as, for unknown reasons, thousands of people begin to emerge from other worlds through the portal; Abendsen leaves through the portal for another life elsewhere.

== Production ==
=== Development ===
In 2010, it was announced that the BBC would co-produce a four-part TV adaptation of The Man in the High Castle for BBC One together with Headline Pictures, FremantleMedia Enterprises and Scott Free Films. Director Ridley Scott was to act as executive producer of the adaptation by Howard Brenton. On February 11, 2013, Variety reported that Syfy was producing the book as a four-part miniseries, with Frank Spotnitz and Scott as executive producers, co-produced with Scott Free Productions, Headline Pictures and Electric Shepherd Prods.

On October 1, 2014, Amazon Studios began filming the pilot episode for a potential television drama to be broadcast on their Prime web video streaming service. Adapted by Spotnitz, the project was produced for Amazon by Scott, David Zucker and Jordan Sheehan for Scott Free, Stewart Mackinnon and Christian Baute for Headline Pictures, Isa Hackett and Kalen Egan for Electric Shepherd and Spotnitz's Big Light Productions. The pilot was released by Amazon Studios on January 15, 2015. Amazon Studios' production process is somewhat different from those of other conventional television channels in that they produce pilot episodes of a number of different prospective programs, then release them and gather data on their success. The most promising shows are then picked up as regular series. On February 18, 2015, Amazon green-lit The Man in the High Castle along with four other series.

The pilot, which premiered in January 2015, was Amazon's "most-watched since the original series development program began". The next month, Amazon ordered a ten-episode season, which was released in November to positive reviews. A second season of ten episodes premiered in December 2016. For the third season, Spotnitz was succeeded by Eric Overmyer as executive producer and showrunner. Season three was released on October 5, 2018. Daniel Percival and David Scarpa took over as showrunners for the fourth, and final, season.

=== Filming ===
Principal filming for the pilot took place in Seattle, with the city standing in for San Francisco and locations in New York City. Filming also took place in Roslyn, Washington, with the town standing in for Canon City and other Neutral Zone locations. Sites used in Seattle include the Seattle Center Monorail, the Paramount Theatre, a newspaper office in the Pike Place Market area, as well as various buildings in the city's Capitol Hill, International District, and Georgetown neighborhoods. In Roslyn, the production used external shots of the Roslyn Cafe, along with several local businesses and scenery.

For the series, filming took place in Vancouver, British Columbia. Specific filming locations included West Georgia Street in the city's downtown core, and the promenade of the Coast Capital Savings building in April 2015. In May and June 2015, filming also took place at the University of British Columbia. Exterior shots of Hohenwerfen Castle in Werfen, Austria, were filmed in September 2015 for the tenth episode of the first season. The interior scene where Hitler and Rudolph Wegener meet was shot on the ground floor of the Bell Tower at Berlin's Olympic Stadium, part of the Olympic complex built during the Nazi era.

== Release ==
The first and second episodes were screened at a special Comic-Con event. The season premiered on November 20, 2015. The second season was released on December 16, 2016. The third season was released on October 5, 2018. The fourth season was released on November 15, 2019.

As of 2026, the series is streaming on Amazon Prime and Netflix.

== Reception ==
Critical response of The Man in the High Castle
Season	Rotten Tomatoes	Metacritic
1	95% (62 reviews)	77 (30 reviews)
2	64% (25 reviews)	62 (10 reviews)
3	86% (21 reviews)	70 (5 reviews)
4	92% (13 reviews)	—N/a

The pilot was Amazon's "most-watched since the original series development program began". The first season received critical acclaim. Rotten Tomatoes gives it an approval rating of 95% based on reviews from 62 critics, with an average rating of 7.5 out of 10. The site's critical consensus states, "By executive producer Ridley Scott, The Man in the High Castle is unlike anything else on TV, with an immediately engrossing plot driven by quickly developed characters in a fully realized post-WWII dystopia." Metacritic gives the first season a score of 77 out of 100, based on reviews from 30 critics, indicating "generally favorable reviews".

Meredith Woerner from io9 wrote, "I can honestly say I loved this pilot. It's an impressive, streamlined undertaking of a fairly complicated and very beloved novel." Matt Fowler from IGN gave it 9.2 out of 10 and described the series as "a superb, frightening experience filled with unexpected twists and (some sci-fi) turns". Brian Moylan of The Guardian was positive and praised the convincing depiction as well as the complex and gripping plot. The Los Angeles Times described the pilot as "provocative" and "smartly adapted by The X-Files' Frank Spotnitz". The Daily Telegraph said it was "absorbing", and Wired called it "must-see viewing". Entertainment Weekly said it was "engrossing" and "a triumph in world-building", cheering, "The Man in the High Castle is king." After the season, Rolling Stone included it on a list of the 40 best science fiction television shows of all time. Amazon subsequently declared it the service's most-streamed original series and renewed it for a second season.

The second season received mixed reviews. Rotten Tomatoes gives it an approval rating of 64%, based on reviews from 25 critics with an average rating of 7 out of 10. The site's critical consensus states, "Although its plot is admittedly unwieldy, The Man in the High Castle's second season expands its fascinating premise in powerful new directions, bolstered by stunning visuals, strong performances, and intriguing new possibilities." Metacritic gave season 2 a score of 62 out of 100, based on reviews from ten critics, indicating "generally favorable reviews".

The third season was met with positive reviews. Rotten Tomatoes gives it an approval rating of 86%, based on reviews from 21 critics with an average rating of 7.4 out of 10. The site's critical consensus states, "The crafty addition of minor sci-fi elements and a terrific William Forsythe to the show's already engrossing narrative make The Man in the High Castle's third season another worthy binge." Metacritic gives season 3 a score of 70 out of 100, based on reviews from five critics, indicating "generally favorable reviews".

The fourth season received positive reviews. Rotten Tomatoes gives it an approval rating of 92%, based on reviews from 13 critics with an average rating of 7.2 out of 10. The site's critical consensus states, "The Man in the High Castle finds something close to closure, wrapping up major threads to bring everything full circle in sufficiently dramatic fashion."

=== Accolades ===
Year	Award	Category	Nominee(s)	Result
2015	IGN Awards	Best New TV Series	The Man in the High Castle	Nominated
2015	South by Southwest Awards	Excellence in Title Design	Patrick Clair	Nominated
2016	American Society of Cinematographers Awards	Outstanding Achievement in Cinematography in Television Movie, Mini-Series or Pilot	James Hawkinson (Episode: "The New World")	Nominated
2016	Creative Arts Emmy Awards	Outstanding Cinematography for a Single-Camera Series	James Hawkinson (Episode: "The New World")	Won
2016	Creative Arts Emmy Awards	Outstanding Main Title Design	Patrick Clair, Paul Kim, Jose Limon, Raoul Marks	Won
2016	Creative Arts Emmy Awards	Outstanding Production Design for a Narrative Contemporary or Fantasy Program (One Hour or More)	Drew Boughton, Linda King, Brenda Meyers-Ballard (Episode: "The New World")	Nominated
2016	Creative Arts Emmy Awards	Outstanding Special Visual Effects	Lawson Deming, Cory Jamieson, Casi Blume, Nick Chamberlain, David Andrade, Bill Parker, Justin Fox, Danielle Malambri (Episode: "The New World")	Nominated
2016	Critics' Choice Television Awards	Best Supporting Actor in a Drama Series	Rufus Sewell	Nominated
2016	Monte-Carlo Television Festival	Best TV Series Drama	The Man in the High Castle	Nominated
2016	Saturn Awards	Best New Media Television Series	The Man in the High Castle	Nominated
2016	USC Scripter Awards	Best Television Script	Frank Spotnitz and Philip K. Dick	Nominated
2016	Visual Effects Society Awards	Outstanding Created Environment in an Episode, Commercial, or Real-Time Project	Casi Blume, David Andrade, Nick Chamberlain, Lawson Deming	Nominated
2016	Visual Effects Society Awards	Outstanding Supporting Visual Effects in a Photoreal Episode	Lawson Deming, Cory Jamieson, Casi Blume, Nick Chamberlain	Nominated
2016	Young Artist Awards	Best Performance in a TV Series—Recurring Young Actor (14–21)	Quinn Lord	Nominated
2017	Artios Awards	Television Pilot And First Season—Drama	Denise Chamian, Liz Ludwitzke, Candice Elzinga, Patti Kalles	Nominated
2017	Creative Arts Emmy Awards	Outstanding Cinematography for a Single-Camera Series (One Hour)	James Hawkinson (Episode: "Fallout")	Nominated
2017	Creative Arts Emmy Awards	Outstanding Original Creative Achievement in Interactive Media within a Scripted Program	"Resistance Radio"	Nominated
2017	Creative Arts Emmy Awards	Outstanding Production Design for a Narrative Period Program (One Hour or More)	Drew Boughton, Jon Lancaster, Dawn Swiderski (Episode: "The Tiger's Cave")	Nominated
2017	Creative Arts Emmy Awards	Outstanding Special Visual Effects	Lawson Deming, Cory Jamieson, Casi Blume, Nick Chamberlain, Justin Fox, Bill Parker, David Andrade, Danielle Malambri (Episode: "Jahr Null")	Nominated
2017	Costume Designers Guild Awards	Outstanding Fantasy Television Series	J.R. Hawbaker	Nominated
2017	Leo Awards	Best Guest Performance by a Male in a Dramatic Series	Kurt Evans	Nominated
2017	Leo Awards	Best Supporting Performance by a Female in a Dramatic Series	Chelah Horsdal	Won
2017	Location Managers Guild Awards	Outstanding Locations in a Period TV Series	Nicole Chartrand, Robert Murdoch	Nominated
2017	Saturn Awards	Best New Media Television Series	The Man in the High Castle	Nominated
2019	Location Managers Guild Awards	Outstanding Locations in Period Television	Nicole Chartrand, Braden Jennings	Nominated
2019	Satellite Awards	Best Genre Series	The Man in the High Castle	Nominated
2019	Visual Effects Society Awards	Outstanding Created Environment in an Episode, Commercial, or Real-Time Project	Casi Blume, Michael Eng, Ben McDougal, Sean Myers ("Reichsmarschall Ceremony")	Nominated
2019	Visual Effects Society Awards	Outstanding Effects Simulations in an Episode, Commercial, or Real-Time Project	Saber Jlassi, Igor Zanic, Chris Parks, Nick Chamberlain ("Statue of Liberty Destruction")	Nominated
2020	Leo Awards	Best Lead Performance by a Female in a Dramatic Series	Chelah Horsdal	Won
2020	Visual Effects Society Awards	Outstanding Model in a Photoreal or Animated Project	Casi Blume, Ben McDougal, Chris Kuhn, Neil Taylor ("Rocket Train")	Nominated

== Advertising controversy ==
As part of an advertising campaign for the season one release, an entire New York City Subway car was covered with Nazi and Imperial Japanese imagery, as seen in the show, including multiple US flags with the Imperial Eagle symbol in place of the 50 stars (a change from the swastika used on the flag in the show), and multiple flags of the fictional Pacific States. In response to criticism from "state lawmakers and city leaders", the Metropolitan Transportation Authority (MTA) released a statement saying that there were no grounds to reject the ads because the neutral content subway ad standards prohibit only advertising that is a political advertisement or disparages an individual or group. MTA spokesperson Kevin Ortiz stated, "The MTA is a government agency and can't accept or reject ads based on how we feel about them; we have to follow the standards approved by our board. Please note they're commercial ads." Spokesperson Adam Lisberg said, "This advertising, whether you find it distasteful or not, obviously they're not advertising Nazism; they're advertising a TV show."

After complaints from New York State Governor Andrew Cuomo and New York City Mayor Bill de Blasio, initial reports indicated that Amazon pulled the advertisement from the subway. It was actually the MTA, not Amazon, that pulled the ad because of pressure from Cuomo.

== See also ==
- Fatherland, 1994 TV film
- Noughts + Crosses, 2020 TV series
- The Other Man, 1964 TV play
- The Plot Against America, 2020 miniseries
- SS-GB, 2017 TV series
- It Happened Here, 1964 film
- Wolfenstein: The New Order (2014) and Wolfenstein II: The New Colossus (2017), video games set in alternate Nazi-dominated 1960s Europe and the United States, respectively
- List of adaptations of works by Philip K. Dick
- Turning Point: Fall of Liberty
