= Elizabeth Crawford (historian) =

Research on British and Irish woman suffrage

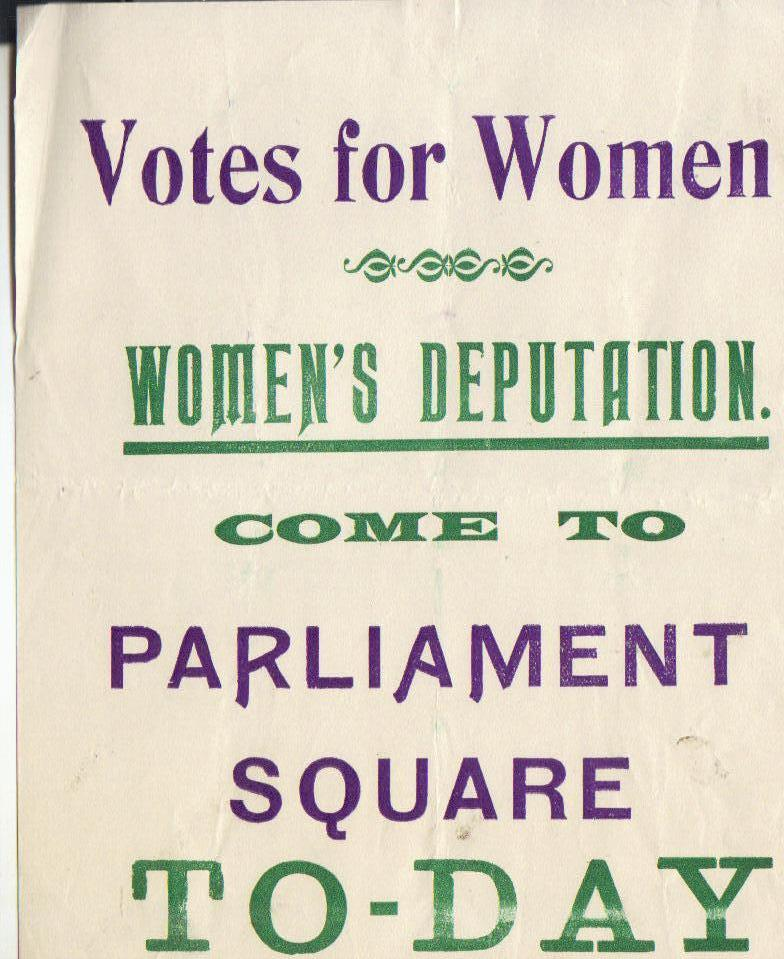
Flyer for the rally that became Black Friday, saved by Kate Frye and included in Campaigning for the Vote: Kate Parry Frye's Suffrage Diary, edited by Elizabeth Crawford. Purple, white and green were colours of the suffrage movement.

Elizabeth Crawford OBE is an English author, independent historian and dealer in suffrage ephemera. She has been called the "Suffrage Detective" and has been appointed OBE for services to education, with special reference to the women's suffrage movement.

== Biography ==
Crawford studied history at the University of Exeter, graduating in 1967.

Crawford has been called the "Suffrage Detective" and has written several "key works" on the history of the suffrage movement in the United Kingdom. These include The Women's Suffrage Movement: A Reference Guide, Art and Suffrage: A Biographical Dictionary of Suffrage Artists, and The Women's Suffrage Movement in Britain and Ireland: A Regional Survey. She has also researched the suffragette 1911 United Kingdom census boycotters and wrote a book with Melissa Terras about the politician, writer, and activist Millicent Garrett Fawcett.

The Reference Guide, in particular, has been termed "indispensable" and a "classic tome." British historian Martin Pugh has called the book, which includes 400 biographies and 800 entries on organisations, a "magnificent research tool and a great stimulus to professionals and amateurs alike."

Crawford has written articles, educational content and blog posts for institutions including BBC History, the British Library, Gresham College, and Oxford University Press.

Crawford has also contributed to radio broadcasts covering the suffrage movement, including on BBC Radio 4's Women's Hour.

In 2018, Crawford was appointed to the Order of the British Empire for services to education, with special reference to the women's suffrage movement. She is a patron of The Mary Clarke Statue Appeal.

In July 2026 Crawford's latest book The British Women's Suffrage Movement in 100 Objects: a material history will be published in paperback by Bloomsbury Publishing.

== Further Information ==
Crawford was the historical consultant for the Suffragette (film) and took part in a podcast by the London School of Economics about it

. Its director Sarah Gavron and producer Faye Ward also took part. It lasted just over fifty minutes and can be heard here.https://www.lse.ac.uk/lse-player/suffragette-the-making-of-the-film
