= Quartet (2012 film) =

2012 British comedy-drama film directed by Dustin Hoffman

- Film poster
- Directed by: Dustin Hoffman
- Screenplay by: Ronald Harwood
- Based on: Quartet by Ronald Harwood
- Produced by: Stewart Mackinnon; Finola Dwyer
- Starring: Maggie Smith; Tom Courtenay; Billy Connolly; Pauline Collins; Michael Gambon
- Cinematography: John de Borman
- Edited by: Barney Pilling
- Music by: Dario Marianelli
- Production companies: DCM Productions; Headline Pictures; Finola Dwyer Productions; BBC Film
- Distributed by: Momentum Pictures
- Release dates: 9 September 2012 (TIFF); 1 January 2013 (UK)
- Running time: 98 minutes
- Country: United Kingdom
- Language: English
- Budget: $11 million
- Box office: $59.5 million

Quartet is a 2012 British comedy-drama film based on the play Quartet by Ronald Harwood that ran in London's West End from September 1999 until January 2000. It was filmed in late 2011 at Hedsor House, Buckinghamshire. The film was actor Dustin Hoffman's directorial debut.

== Plot ==
In Beecham House, a retirement home for former professional musicians patterned after the real-life Casa di Riposo per Musicisti founded by Giuseppe Verdi, Reg, Wilf and Cissy are retired opera singers who had often worked together. Among other residents are Cedric Livingstone, a former director, and diva Anne Langley. All the guests in the retirement home are suffering in varying degrees from the ailments that old age can bring, but continue to be engaged in their former professions, including lecturing and introducing young people to music.

Finances threaten closure of the home, but proceeds from a yearly gala concert on Verdi's birthday hold hope for a continuation. However, Cedric has become rather desperate because some of the most prominent singers have either died or decided not to participate at all. Reg, Wilf and Cissy were in the cast of a very highly rated recording of the opera Rigoletto, which includes a famous quartet for soprano, mezzo-soprano, tenor and baritone ("Bella figlia dell'amore"). This version is very prominent among opera buffs as the definitive Rigoletto of the post-war era.

Reg is shocked to find his former wife Jean Horton moving into Beecham House. She is the missing soprano of the Rigoletto recording, and Reg is angry neither to have been warned nor consulted about her arrival, as their parting was on very sour terms. At first, Jean tries unsuccessfully to mend things with Reg. In the ensuing conversations, her infidelity arises, as well as her past marriages, but Reg comes to understand that it is all in the past.

In the meantime, Cedric has devised a plan that could work but has one flaw. He meets with Wilf, Cissy and Reg to put his idea to them. His hope is to convince them to re-form the quartet who sang on the famous recording and to sing it again for the Verdi Gala concert, hoping that it will sell enough tickets to save the home. Reg is sceptical but agrees, having overcome his issues and problems with Jean living at the home and being in such close daily proximity. Wilf persuades the doctor in charge to allow them a night out, resulting in Reg, Wilf and Cissy inviting Jean to dinner. Blissfully unaware and thinking friendships are mended with the past forgotten, Jean accepts the invitation. However, she is harder to persuade, for she vowed never to sing again after retiring, resulting in her getting angry and storming out of the restaurant.

The following morning, Cissy brings Jean flowers from the garden to cheer her up and asks if she wishes to discuss the quartet. Jean does not want to take the flowers and hits Cissy with them, which aggravates Cissy's already delicate senile condition. Jean feels horrible for her behaviour and attempts to apologise but is not able to see Cissy and instead sees an old fling in the infirmary. He convinces her to appear in the Gala, even if she has to do magic tricks. Jean is finally able to apologise to Cissy and is persuaded to sing in the quartet from Rigoletto after learning that Anne Langley will be singing "Vissi d'arte" from Tosca as a finale, unless the four of them sing together, in which case, they will be given the honour of performing last. The group prepares for their performance, but moments before their curtain call, Cissy gets very confused and attempts to walk out the door, saying that she has to go back to her family. But Jean manages to salvage the situation. During her conversation with Cissy, Jean expresses regret for all of her bad behaviour towards Reg and admits that she is still in love with him. Reg overhears it.

As the recital is about to start, the director of the home is amazed at the energy displayed by the home's guests. The idea of rehearsing and playing before an audience has rejuvenated the home and the quartet. Prior to going on stage, Reg again asks Jean to marry him. As the quartet individually enters the stage to a rapturous applause, Reg stands next to Jean. Jean asks Reg if he was serious, and he replies affirmatively. Jean accepts and takes Reg by the hand as the Quartet begin to sing.

== Cast ==
- Maggie Smith as Jean Horton, Reg's ex-wife and the soprano of the Rigoletto recording
- Tom Courtenay as Reginald "Reg" Paget, Jean's ex-husband who teaches classical music to teenagers, and the tenor of the Rigoletto recording
- Gwyneth Jones as Anne Langley, an aging diva, and longtime resident of Beecham House
- Michael Gambon as Cedric Livingstone, a cantankerous old director and longtime resident of Beecham House
- Billy Connolly as Wilfred "Wilf" Bond, a womanising, fun-loving former opera singer, and the baritone of the Rigoletto recording
- Pauline Collins as Cecily "Cissy" Robson, a kindly, slightly senile former opera singer and the mezzo-soprano of the Rigoletto recording
- Sheridan Smith as Dr Lucy Cogan
- Andrew Sachs as Bobby Swanson
- Trevor Peacock as George
- David Ryall as Harry
- Luke Newberry as Simon
- Michael Byrne as Frank White

Many of the supporting and background cast in the film's "retirement home for former professional musicians" were portrayed by actual professional musicians, as illustrated by then-and-now photos during the closing credits:

- Patricia Varley – Carl Rosa Opera Company
- John Rawnsley – English National Opera (ENO)
- John Georgiadis – London Symphony Orchestra
- John Heley – Royal Philharmonic Orchestra
- Ita Herbert – English Chamber Orchestra
- Graeme Scott – BBC Symphony Orchestra (BBC SO)
- Cynthia Morey – D'Oyly Carte Opera Company
- Jack Honeyborne – musical director for Vera Lynn
- Nuala Willis – Royal Opera House
- Melodie Waddingham – ENO
- Colin Bradbury – BBC SO
- Ronnie Hughes – toured in the Frank Sinatra Orchestra

== Production ==
Headline Pictures' Mark Shivas and Stewart Mackinnon acquired the film rights to the play from Ronald Harwood and, with funding from BBC Film, commissioned him to write the screenplay. Mackinnon subsequently approached a number of co-producers and directors, and eventually contracted producer Finola Dwyer and director Dustin Hoffman. Mark Shivas died four years before the film was completed.

Quartet is set at Beecham House, a retirement home for musicians. Hedsor House in Buckinghamshire was used as the location of Beecham House. Several scenes were filmed at St Nicholas' Church, Hedsor.

Dustin Hoffman said that Harwood was inspired by the 1984 documentary Tosca's Kiss (about the world's first nursing home for retired opera singers, founded in 1896 in Milan by composer Giuseppe Verdi) to write the original play on which the film is based.

== Release ==
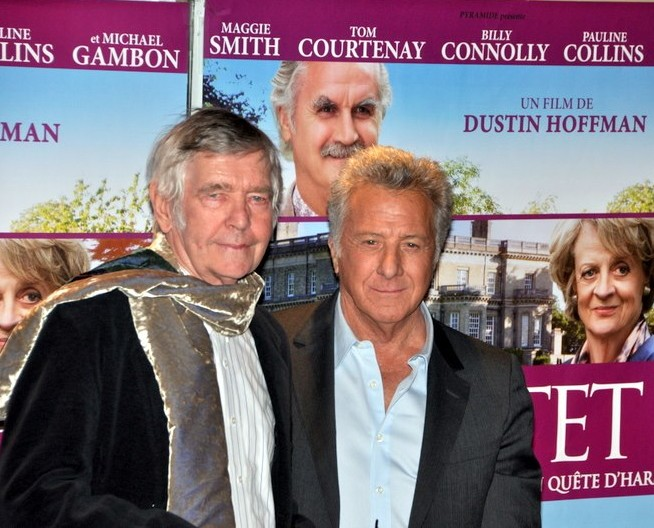
Star Tom Courtenay and director Dustin Hoffman in Paris at the film's French premiere, March 2013

Quartet premiered at the 2012 Toronto International Film Festival on 9 September 2012, followed by screenings at another dozen film festivals during autumn 2012. The film had its first general release in Australia and New Zealand on 26 December 2012. It was released in the United Kingdom on 1 January 2013 and in Ireland three days later. It saw a limited release in the United States on 11 January 2013.

Quartet was also screened at Cardiff's Cineworld complex on Thursday, 6 December 2012, at an event arranged by the Rotary Club of Blackwood, with proceeds donated to charities. The premiere was attended by the film's producer Finola Dwyer, who gave an interview on the making of the film.

Quartet was released on DVD and Blu-ray/DVD/digital on 6 May 2013 in the UK, and on 18 June 2013 in the US.

== Reception ==
Quartet received generally positive reviews. The review aggregator website Rotten Tomatoes reports an 80% approval rating, with an average rating of 6.5/10, based on 145 reviews. The website's consensus reads: "It's sweet, gentle, and predictable to a fault, but Dustin Hoffman's affectionate direction and the talented cast's amiable charm make Quartet too difficult to resist." Metacritic gave a score of 64 out of 100, based on 36 reviews, indicating "generally favorable" reviews.

Lisa Schwarzbaum of Entertainment Weekly gave the movie a "B", writing:

This lulling inspirational fantasy/comedy in the key of The Best Exotic Marigold Hotel offers aging, cultured Englishfolk (and one randy Scot, played by Billy Connolly) living out their golden years in a beautifully maintained residence for retired musicians. Every vista suggests that this gracious oldies' home is situated down the road from Downton Abbey, and every scene insists that real physical or mental infirmity belongs in some other picture.
