= Sara Scuderi =

Italian opera singer

Sara Scuderi in Tosca, 1945 (photo with dedication).

Sara Scuderi (11 December 1906 – 24 December 1987) was an Italian opera singer. She sang widely in Italy and Europe (most notably in the Netherlands), having had a seven-year contract at La Scala, "where she received high praise for her interpretations of the most well-known operas".

== Biography ==
Sara Scuderi as Santuzza in Cavalleria rusticana, Teatro Carlo Felice, Genoa, may 1942 (photo with dedication).

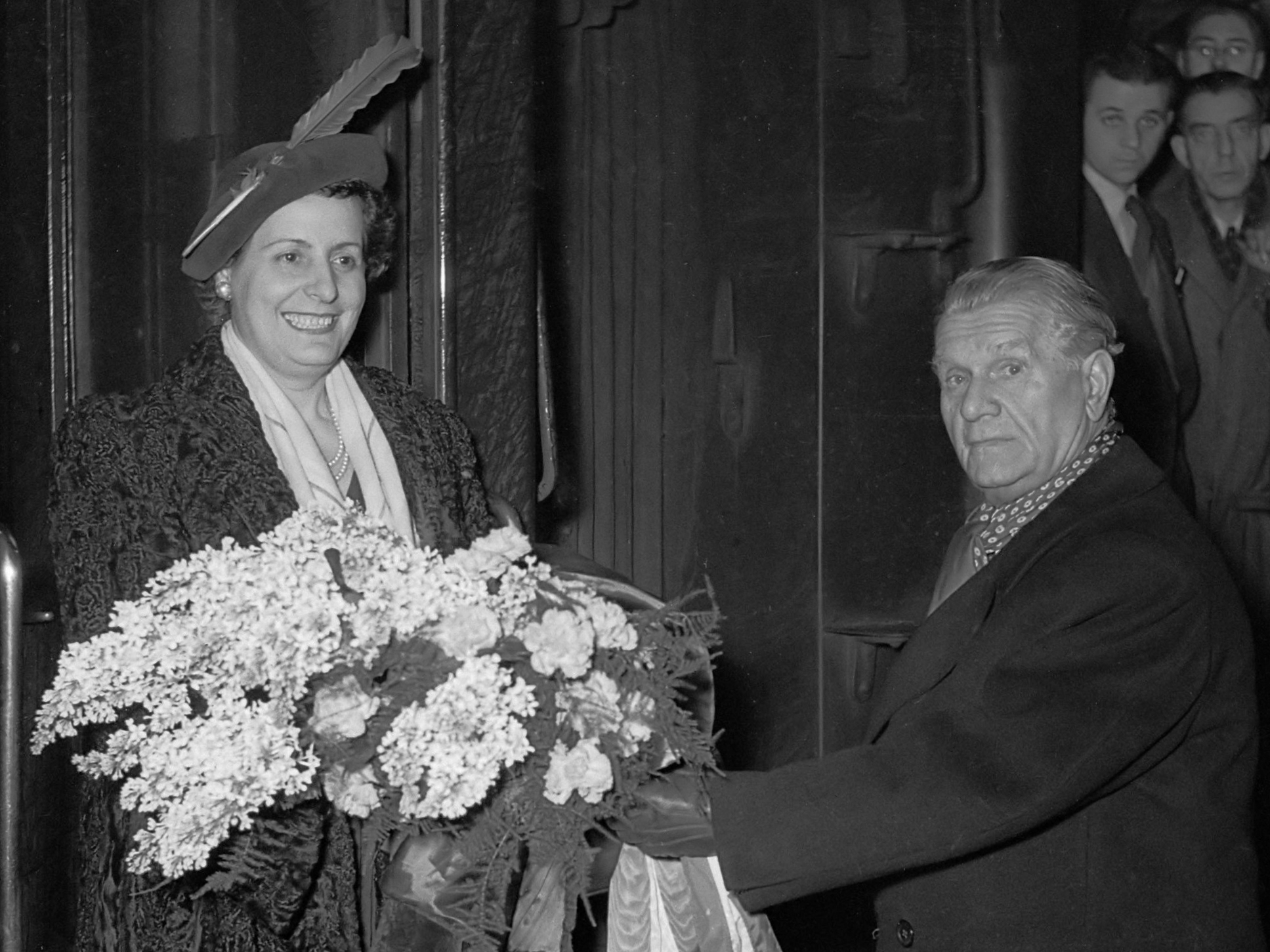
Sara Scuderi and Alex Wunnink (1952)

Born in Catania, Sicily, Scuderi made her debut at the Teatro Lirico Coccia in Novara playing Leonora in Il Trovatore (November 1925). Scuderi studied under Matteo Adernò.

She was engaged in a seven-year contract with Milan's Teatro Alla Scala, where she received high praise and partnered with the most famous male artists of her time, including Beniamino Gigli and Galliano Masini.

Her interpretations of Tosca are particularly celebrated, with the 1937 production at the Terme di Caracalla, with Beniamino Gigli and Luigi Montesanto being among the best known. Additionally, she premiered the operas Il volto della Vergine (Ezio Camussi) and Giulio Cesare (Malipiero).

Scuderi sang in the most important theatres of the day, both in Italy and abroad, particularly in Amsterdam, where she signed a seven-year contract and was a major star. She toured several times with La Scala to Brazil and Argentina, where she sang Tosca with Giuseppe Lugo.

She retired from the stage at the end of the 1940s.

For the latter part of her life, she lived at the Casa di Riposo per Musicisti, the world's first nursing home for retired opera singers, founded by composer Giuseppe Verdi in 1896. Film director Daniel Schmid used Scuderi as a central character in his capture of the essence of the retirement home for these former glories in his Il Bacio di Tosca, in 1984. Scuderi died three years later, in 1987.
