= Quartet (Harwood play) =

- Written by: Ronald Harwood
- Characters: Reggie; Wilfred; Jean; Cecily
- Original language: English

Premiere
- Date premiered: 8 September 1999
- Place premiered: Albery Theatre, London

Quartet is a play by Ronald Harwood about aging opera singers.

The play, presented by Michael Codron, was first directed by Christopher Morahan at the Yvonne Arnaud Theatre in Guildford prior to its West End opening at the Albery Theatre (now the Noël Coward Theatre) on 8 September 1999 starring Sir Donald Sinden as Wilfred, Alec McCowen as Reginald, Stephanie Cole as Cecily and Angela Thorne as Jean. Following a four-month run it closed on 8 January 2000.

A regional tour from June to August 2010 enjoyed success with Michael Jayston as Reggie, Timothy West as Wilfred, Susannah York as Jean, and Gwen Taylor as Cecily.

== Plot ==
The setting is a retirement home for musicians. Three elderly former opera-singers, who often worked together, are sitting out on the terrace. Reginald is quietly reading a serious book, but jovial, priapic Wilfred is chuckling about sex, as he regards Cissy, lying back and listening to music through her headphones.

They are about to be joined by newcomer Jean, who was a major star in her day and to whom Reginald was once unhappily married.

Is there any chance that these four will ever sing together again? A gala concert is about to take place at the retirement home to celebrate Verdi's birthday. Three of the four are keen to recreate the third act quartet "Bella figlia dell'amore" from Rigoletto and one is not. But the play eventually moves to an uncertain conclusion when they don costumes and lip-synch to their own retro recording.

== Critical reaction ==
Writing for The Independent, Paul Taylor described the play as "an unashamed – no, shameless – vehicle for four feisty old troupers whose task is to make us laugh a little, sigh a little and cry a little as they take us into the bittersweet world of facing up to age and mortality."

Charles Spencer for The Daily Telegraph wrote: "the show's heart is in the right place and a cherishable company of senior thesps give it everything they've got, breathing vitality into a script that could be an inert embarrassment if performed by less accomplished players."

Reviewing the play for The Spectator, Sheridan Morley concluded: "Harwood seems to have set out with something sad to say about the ravages of age on a profession which largely depends on staying young, but then to have been sidetracked into a sort of Three Tenors concert celebration without the Three Tenors. So his play doesn’t end, it just stops, and we are left with nothing more than the memory of four performances desperately trying to make bricks despite a distinct lack of straw; if Harwood has anything new to tell us about singers who have for different reasons lost their voices and yet are now going unquietly into that good night he seems, like his characters, to have abruptly and irretrievably forgotten what he was going to say. And the rest is a kind of silence."

== Film adaptation ==
The play was adapted as a film by Harwood himself in 2012. Quartet was directed by Dustin Hoffman and the principal cast includes Maggie Smith as Jean, Tom Courtenay as Reg, Pauline Collins as Cissy and Billy Connolly as Wilfred. The production was filmed at Hedsor House, Buckinghamshire.
