= Suffragette (film) =

2015 film by Sarah Gavron

- Theatrical release poster
- Directed by: Sarah Gavron
- Written by: Abi Morgan
- Produced by: Alison Owen; Faye Ward
- Starring: Carey Mulligan; Helena Bonham Carter; Brendan Gleeson; Anne-Marie Duff; Ben Whishaw; Meryl Streep
- Cinematography: Eduard Grau
- Edited by: Barney Pilling
- Music by: Alexandre Desplat
- Production companies: Film4; BFI; Ingenious Media; Canal+; Ciné+; Ruby Films; Pathé
- Distributed by: 20th Century Fox (United Kingdom); Focus Features (United States)
- Release dates: 4 September 2015 (Telluride); 12 October 2015
- Running time: 106 minutes
- Countries: United Kingdom; France; United States
- Language: English
- Budget: $14 million
- Box office: $38 million

Suffragette is a 2015 historical drama film about women's suffrage in the United Kingdom, directed by Sarah Gavron and written by Abi Morgan. Elizabeth Crawford was the historical consultant. The film stars Carey Mulligan, Helena Bonham Carter, Brendan Gleeson, Anne-Marie Duff, Ben Whishaw, and Meryl Streep.

Filming began on 24 February 2014. It is the first feature film to be shot in the Houses of Parliament. The film was released in the United Kingdom on 12 October 2015 by the French film company Pathé through its British distributor 20th Century Fox. Originally scheduled to be released by Relativity Media, the film was ultimately released in a limited release in North America on 23 October 2015 by Focus Features.

== Plot ==
In 1912, Maud Watts is a 24-year-old laundry worker. While delivering a package, she is caught up in a suffragette protest that includes her workmate, Violet Miller.

Alice Haughton, the wife of an MP, encourages women from the laundry to testify to a Parliamentary committee. Violet offers but is beaten by her abusive husband. Maud testifies in her stead. The women later learn, at a public announcement, that the vote is not to be extended. Maud is caught up in the protest, arrested, and jailed for a week. While in jail, she meets Emily Davison, a confidante of Emmeline Pankhurst.

Maud faces animosity from neighbours and workmates. She tells her husband Sonny that she will stay away from the suffragettes, but attends a secret rally to hear Pankhurst speak. She has a brief exchange with Pankhurst. Again detained, she is taken home by police. This time, her husband throws her out. Maud struggles to see her son George while continuing to work. When her picture is published and she is identified as a suffragette, she is sacked and, past breaking point, she burns the hand of her male supervisor, who has been sexually abusing girls in the laundry for years, including Maud when she was younger, and Maggie, Violet's daughter. The police are called, and Inspector Steed allows Maud to leave, offering her an opportunity to act as an informer. After leaving, Maud writes a letter to Steed refusing his offer.

Sonny continues to prevent Maud from seeing their son, George. This prompts Maud into more radicalism in favour of women's rights. She learns that Sonny has had George adopted by another couple. Maud becomes more radical and is involved in bombing pillar boxes and cutting telegraph wires. She and her comrades are imprisoned after they blow up the empty house of a government minister. In prison, Maud goes on hunger strike and is subjected to brutal force-feeding.

The suffragettes feel that they must do still more to gain attention. They decide to attend the Derby when King George V will be in attendance, planning to step in front of the cameras and unfurl their banners. Before they go, Emily Davison hands Maud a copy of Dreams (1890), a book by Olive Schreiner that has been passed from one suffragette to another. On the day of the Derby, only Maud and Emily attend. They are barred from the area near the King, but Emily decides that they must carry on anyway. While the race is underway, Emily runs onto the track, stepping in front of the King's horse, and Maud witnesses her being trampled to death. After returning to London, Maud retrieves Violet's daughter from the laundry, and takes her to the home of Alice Haughton, who agrees that Maggie can work there instead. Maud later joins in Emily's funeral procession. The film ends by stating that Emily's funeral was reported around the world; and that certain women over 30 in the UK were given the right to vote in 1918, rights over their own children in 1925, and the same voting rights as men in 1928. Scrolling text lists countries that preceded Britain in giving women the vote and others that did so later.

== Cast ==
- Carey Mulligan as Maud Watts
- Helena Bonham Carter as Edith Ellyn. Although the character of Ellyn is fictitious, she was loosely based on Edith Garrud and Edith New.
- Meryl Streep as Emmeline Pankhurst
- Natalie Press as Emily Davison
- Anne-Marie Duff as Violet Miller
- Romola Garai as Alice Haughton
- Ben Whishaw as Sonny Watts
- Brendan Gleeson as Arthur Steed
- Samuel West as Benedict Haughton
- Adrian Schiller as David Lloyd George
- Morgan Watkins as Malcolm Walsop
- Lorraine Stanley as Mrs Coleman
- Amanda Lawrence as Miss Withers
- Adam Nagaitis as Mr Cummins
- Emma Morgano as Miss Plook
- Lisa Dillon as Mrs Drayton
- Edward Turvey as Tictac man

Only Pankhurst, Davison, Lloyd George and King George V are not fictitious.

== Production ==
=== Development ===
In April 2011, it was announced that Film4 Productions, Focus Features and Ruby Films were developing a history drama film about the British women's suffrage movement of the late 19th and early 20th century. Abi Morgan was set to write the script while Sarah Gavron was attached to direct the film. On 24 October 2013, it was revealed that Pathé had replaced Focus, while the BFI Film Fund was to fund the film and that Ryan Kavanaugh was attached to produce it.

=== Casting ===
Carey Mulligan was cast to play the lead role on 24 February 2013; Helena Bonham Carter joined on 20 December 2013; Meryl Streep was cast as British suffragette leader Emmeline Pankhurst on 19 February 2014; Ben Whishaw and Brendan Gleeson joined the cast on 20 February 2014.

=== Filming ===
Principal photography began on 24 February 2014 in London. The production also visited The Historic Dockyard Chatham where they filmed the factory and prison scenes.

== Release ==
The film was released in the United Kingdom and Ireland on 12 October 2015 by Pathé, distributed by 20th Century Fox.

In October 2014, Relativity Media acquired only the North American rights and Pathé acquired the international rights to distribute the film. However, on 17 March 2015, Focus Features took over the North American distribution rights, also acquiring rights for Latin America, India, South Korea and most of Eastern Europe including Russia, with producer Ryan Kavanaugh dropping out as producer following the bankruptcy of Relativity. Focus Features then set the film for a limited release in the United States on 23 October 2015.

In June 2015, it was announced that Suffragette would receive its European premiere on 7 October 2015 as the opening film of the BFI London Film Festival. The LFF director, Clare Stewart, said Gavron's feature was an "urgent and compelling film, made by British women, about British women who changed the course of history". The film premiered at the Telluride Film Festival on 4 September 2015.

To promote the film before its October 2015 release, Suffragette teamed with the magazine Time Out London to develop a marketing campaign featuring the film's stars. After its publication in September 2015, the resulting material generated controversy among media outlets. Mulligan, Streep, Garai and Duff appeared in a promotional photograph wearing T-shirts emblazoned with a Pankhurst quotation used in the film: "I'd rather be a rebel than a slave". This quickly led to a media furore, with critics describing the magazine's choice of slogan "unfortunate", "tone-deaf", and "racist". Scholar Ana Stevenson noted that while from a historical perspective the usage of the Pankhurst quotation in the film was accurate, "Meryl Streep, Carey Mulligan, Romola Garai and Anne-Marie Duff are rich, privileged, white women who are celebrity movie stars – certainly not slaves"; Stevenson further argued that there is "a perversity in claiming otherwise when racial discrimination and domestic violence remain very present concerns".

The feminist group Sisters Uncut demonstrated at the London premiere against government cuts to domestic violence services. Bonham Carter described the protest as "perfect. If you feel strongly enough about something and there's an injustice there you can speak out and try to get something changed". Carey Mulligan said that the protest was "awesome" and that she was sad she had missed it.

== Reception ==
=== Box office ===
Suffragette grossed $38 million against a budget of $14 million.

=== Critical reception ===
Suffragette has received positive reviews. On Rotten Tomatoes, the film has a rating of 73%, based on 223 reviews, with an average rating of 6.70/10. The website's critical consensus reads, "Suffragette dramatizes an important – and still painfully relevant – fact-based story with more than enough craft and sincerity to overcome its flaws." On Metacritic, the film holds a score of 64 out of 100, based on 37 critics, indicating "generally favourable reviews".

=== Awards ===
Year	Award	Category	Nominee	Result	Ref.
2015	British Independent Film Awards	Best Supporting Actor	Brendan Gleeson	Won	
2015	Hamptons International Film Festival	Tangerine Entertainment Juice Award	Sarah Gavron	Won	
2015	19th Hollywood Film Awards	Hollywood Actress Award	Carey Mulligan	Won	
2015	Mill Valley Film Festival	Audience Favorite Gold Award–2015 Mind the Gap: Women-Work-Film	Sarah Gavron	Won	
2015	Mill Valley Film Festival	Spotlight Award	Carey Mulligan	Won	

== Further Information ==
In 2015, the London School of Economics made a podcast of an interview with the producer, director and historical consultant of the film. It lasts just over 50 minutes and can be heard here: https://www.lse.ac.uk/lse-player/suffragette-the-making-of-the-film

== See also ==
- Suffragette bombing and arson campaign
- List of suffragette bombings
- Shoulder to Shoulder
- Iron Jawed Angels (2004 film)
- Suffs (2022 musical)
- Feminism in the United Kingdom
