= Sarah Gavron =

British film director (born 1970)

- Born: 20 April 1970 (age 56); United Kingdom
- Occupation: Film director
- Years active: 2000–present
- Spouse: David Katznelson
- Children: 2
- Parent(s): Robert Gavron; Nicky Gavron

Sarah Gavron (born 20 April 1970) is a British film director. She has directed four short films, and three feature films. Her first film was This Little Life (2003), later followed by Brick Lane (2007) and Village at the End of the World (2012). Her film, Suffragette (2015) is based in the London of 1912 and tells the story of the Suffragette movement based on realistic historical events. Her most recent film is Rocks (2019) which she directed in a creative collaboration with the team and young cast.

== Biography ==
Sarah Gavron was educated at Camden School for Girls. She graduated from the University of York with a BA in English in 1992 and an MA in film studies from Edinburgh College of Art when it was associated with Heriot-Watt University. Later, she went to the National Film and Television School. Gavron was in a directing class that was taught by Stephen Frears. Frears is one of her influences in filmmaking and directing, as well as Mike Leigh and Terence Davies. She cites many female filmmakers as having inspired her. Before studying at the National Film School, she worked for the BBC in documentaries for three years.

Gavron is married to cinematographer David Katznelson, and together, they have two children. Gavron has said she "got into filmmaking to make a difference." She has dedicated her career to telling the stories of women. In addition, the scarcity of women filmmakers in the UK is what inspires Gavron with her own filmmaking, and her responsibility as a female director.

== Career ==
Gavron began her film career making documentaries, a field that seemed "more accessible at that point," but kept returning to narrative filmmaking because of her desire to tell stories.

Her first film, This Little Life (2003), is classified as a television drama, with the plot surrounding a couple and their premature born child; Brick Lane (2007) is her second most recognized feature film, that is an adaptation of Monica Ali's novel of the same name, which encapsulates the life of a Bangladeshi, female immigrant living in London, U.K; Village at the End of the World (2012) is a documentary that Gavron directed in a peninsula in Greenland. Her next film, Suffragette (2015), is set in London of 1912 and tells the story of the Suffragette movement, specifically, the lives of three women that take on fictitious names in the film, however represent non-fictional historical figures.

In Brick Lane (2007), Gavron centers on the female protagonist in "one of the most ethnically diverse neighborhoods in the United Kingdom."

Suffragette (2015) is "this first major feature film to focus on the fight for women's suffrage”. The film conveys important themes regarding legal and social positions of women, wives and mothers in 1912. Gavron believes that the women's suffrage movement must be regarded as a "multi stranded, and complex story that is still unfolding." Gavron intended Suffragette to be telling of important moments in the past, but also relevant in present day. Suffragette was acquired by Focus Features (originally Relativity) in March 2015. The film premiered at the 2015 Telluride Film Festival.The London School of Economics made a podcast about the making of the film and featuring Gavron, producer Faye Adams and historical consultant Elizabeth Crawford. The podcast lasts just over fifty minutes and can be heard here: https://www.lse.ac.uk/lse-player/suffragette-the-making-of-the-film

Her most recent film, Rocks, premiered at the 2019 Toronto International Film Festival in the Platform Prize program.

== Favourite films ==
In 2022, Gavron participated in the Sight & Sound film polls of that year. It is held every ten years to select the greatest films of all time, by asking contemporary directors to select ten films of their choice.

Gavron's selections were:

- The Piano (1993)
- Persepolis (2007)
- I Am Cuba (1964)
- The Ascent (1977)
- Ratcatcher (1999)
- A Separation (2011)
- Divines (2016)
- Fanny and Alexander (1982)
- Shoplifters (2018)
- Secrets & Lies (1996)

== Filmography ==
Feature films

- Brick Lane (2007)
- Suffragette (2015)
- Rocks (2019)

Short films

- The Girl in the Lay-By (2000)
- Losing Touch (2000)
- Village at the End of the World (2013)

Television films

- This Little Life (2003)

== Awards and nominations ==
Sarah Gavron was nominated for the BAFTA Award and BIFA for best director in 2007 for her film Brick Lane. The film won a Silver Hitchcock and best screenplay at the Dinard Festival of British Cinema. She received the Tangerine Entertainment Juice Award from the Hamptons International Film Festival for directing the movie Suffragette, as well as the Mill Valley Film Festival's Audience Award (Mind the Gap), also for directing that film.

Year	Association	Category	Title	Result	Ref.
2003	British Independent Film Awards	Douglas Hickox Award	This Little Life	Nominated	
2003	BAFTA TV Awards	Best Single Drama	This Little Life	Nominated	
2004	BAFTA TV Awards	Best New Director (Fiction)	This Little Life	Won	
2007	British Independent Film Awards	Best Director	Brick Lane	Nominated	
2007	BFI London Film Festival	Alfred Dunhill UK Film Talent Award	Brick Lane	Won	
2007	San Sebastián International Film Festival	C.I.C.A.E. Award	Brick Lane	Won	
2008	BAFTA Film Awards	Carl Foreman Award for Special Achievement by a British Director	Brick Lane	Nominated	
2008	London Critics Circle Film Awards	British Breakthrough - Filmmaking	Brick Lane	Nominated	
2015	Alliance of Women Film Journalists	EDA Female Focus Award - Best Woman Director	Suffragette	Nominated	
2015	Camerimage	Golden Frog - Main Competition	Suffragette	Nominated	
2015	Hamptons International Film Festival	Tangerine Entertainment Juice Award	Suffragette	Won	
2015	Mill Valley Film Festival	Audience Award - Mind the Gap	Suffragette	Won	
2015	Women Film Critics Circle	Courage in Filmmaking Award	Suffragette	Won	
2015	Women Film Critics Circle	Best Movie by a Woman	Suffragette	Won	
2015	Women's Image Network Awards	Outstanding Feature Film	Suffragette	Nominated	
2016	Empire Awards	Best British Film	Suffragette	Nominated	
2016	Athena Film Festival	Ensemble Award	Suffragette	Won	
2016	European Film Awards	Best Production Designer	Suffragette	Won	
2016	Turia Awards, Spain	Audience Award - Best Foreign Film	Suffragette	Won	
2016	WFTV Awards	Deluxe Director Award	Herself	Won	
2021	BAFTA Film Awards	Best Director	Rocks	Nominated	
2021	British Independent Film Awards	Best British Independent Film	Rocks	Won	
2021	British Independent Film Awards	Best Director	Rocks	Nominated	

== See also ==
- List of female film and television directors
