= Radical Illustrators =

Radical Illustrators was a one-off issue of Illustrators magazine (no. 38). It was edited by George Snow and Robert Mason and published by the Association of Illustrators in England in 1981. This issue of Illustrators magazine is notable capturing a movement in the art form of illustration, in its reactionary and rejection of popular mainstream illustration of the time.

Many contributors of Radical Illustrators were graduates of the Royal College of Art and many have since become established practitioners and teachers in the fields of illustration, moving image, fine art and writing.

In the mid-1980s, George Snow, co-editor of Radical Illustrators referenced the work of Stewart MacKinnon as “perhaps the greatest single influence on today’s Radical Illustrators.” Snow adds, "The formal construction of his work (particularly the figures) established the 'mood', which is so much a part of contemporary radicals' work."

Contributors of Radical Illustrators included:

- Edward Bell
- Sue Coe
- Georgeanne Deen
- Catherine Denvir
- Terry Dowling
- Blair Drawson
- Robert Ellis
- Carolyn Gowdy
- Anne Howeson
- Rod Judkins
- Andrzej Klimowski
- Stewart Mackinnon
- Robert Mason
- Shinro Ohtake
- Ian Pollock
- Liz Pyle
- Brothers Quay
- Sol Robbins
- Christine Roche
- George Snow
- Jake Tilson
