= Diarmuid Lawrence =

English television director (1947–2019)

Diarmuid Seton Lawrence (15 October 1947 – 20 September 2019) was an English television director.

Born in Westcliff-on-Sea in Essex, Lawrence began his career in 1978 as a production assistant on the BBC television drama Pennies from Heaven. Two years later he made his directorial debut with Play for Today.

Lawrence's credits include The Witches and the Grinnygog, Mapp & Lucia, Quirke, Grange Hill, Anglo Saxon Attitudes, Minder, The Hanging Gale, Casualty, Silent Witness, Little Dorrit, Messiah, and Desperate Romantics. In 1990, his direction of Beyond the Pale won him the Golden Gate Award for Best Television Feature at the San Francisco International Film Festival. He was the recipient in 1993 of the British Academy Television Award (BAFTA) for Best Drama Serial for Anglo Saxon Attitudes. In 2017 he received an International Emmy Kids Award for the best Kids TV Movie/Mini-Series for Peter and Wendy.

He died on 20 September 2019.
