= Headline Pictures =

British film production company

Headline Pictures Limited
- Formerly: Common Features Limited (1995–2005)
- Company type: Private limited
- Industry: Film and television production
- Founded: January 2005.
- Founder: Stewart Mackinnon; Mark Shivas
- Headquarters: London, England
- Key people: Christian Baute
- Website: headline-pictures.com

Headline Pictures Limited is an International Emmy-winning British film and television production company founded in 2005 by BAFTA nominee Stewart Mackinnon, former BBC Head of Drama Mark Shivas and screenwriter Kevin Hood. The company is now part of the UGC group.

The company has developed and produced film and television including The Man in the High Castle for Amazon Studios written by X-Files creator Frank Spotnitz; Irish crime series Kin starring Charlie Cox; the feature film Quartet, directed by Dustin Hoffman; and feature film The Invisible Woman directed by Ralph Fiennes.

== History ==
Headline Pictures grew out of Trade Films, a Newcastle-based production company which made TV documentaries (including the Grierson Award-winning The Miners' Campaign Video Tapes) and TV drama between the mid-1970s and the mid-1990s, and Common Features, which produced award-winning films such as This Little Life, winning accolades such as the BANFF Award

and the Dennis Potter Award.[13] Between 2005 and 2018 Headline Pictures was an independent production company, producing film and television for the international market including the Man in the High Castle and Quartet. In 2018 the company became part of UGC Images, and produced series including Kin and Ten Percent, the UK remake of Call My Agent![14][15]

== Productions ==
Headline Pictures' first television mini series was Bag of Bones starring Pierce Brosnan, based on the book by Stephen King, which was filmed in Nova Scotia and premiered in 2011 on the A&E Network in the USA.

In 2015 Headline Pictures produced the International Emmy-winning TV film Peter & Wendy: Based on the novel Peter Pan by J. M. Barrie, starring Stanley Tucci, Paloma Faith and Laura Fraser, written by BAFTA winner Adrian Hodges and directed by BAFTA winner Diarmuid Lawrence, produced in association with Great Ormond Street Hospital Children's Charity for ITV over Christmas 2015

Over the course of many years Headline Pictures developed and produced, in partnership with Scott Free and Electric Shepherd Productions, The Man in the High Castle, which ran for four seasons on Amazon Prime Video, based on the classic alternate history novel by Philip K. Dick.

In 2014 and 2015 Headline Pictures co-produced The Saboteurs, a six-episode TV miniseries which tells the story of the Nazi nuclear weapon project and the sabotage in Norway to disrupt it during the Second World War, with a particular emphasis on the role of Leif Tronstad, broadcast on More4 and across Europe.

Headline Pictures' films include Quartet, starring Dame Maggie Smith and Tom Courtenay, a British comedy about professional rivalry and lost love. It was released in 2012 and to date has grossed over $60 million worldwide. It was written by Academy award winner Sir Ronald Harwood and was the directorial debut for Academy Award-winning actor Dustin Hoffman. Other films include The Invisible Woman directed by Ralph Fiennes, starring Felicity Jones, Kristin Scott Thomas, and Tom Hollander, written by Abi Morgan, telling the story of the secret love affair between Charles Dickens and Nelly Ternan.

More recent Headline Pictures productions include the series Kin starring Charlie Cox, Ciarán Hinds, Aidan Gillen and Clare Dunne and the English language remake of French series Call My Agent! adapted by the creator of W1A, John Morton, with guest stars including Helena Bonham Carter, Jim Broadbent and David Oyelowo. Its title has been revealed to be Ten Percent.

=== Filmography ===
Television

- Bag of Bones (2011)
- The Saboteurs (2015)
- Peter & Wendy: Based on the novel Peter Pan by J. M. Barrie (2015)
- The Man in the High Castle (2015–2019)
- Kin (2021–)
- Ten Percent (2022–)

Film

- Quartet (2012) (Distributed by Momentum Pictures)
- The Invisible Woman (2013) (Distributed by Lionsgate UK)
