= List of adaptations of works by Philip K. Dick =

Philip K. Dick was an American author known for his science fiction works, often with dystopian and drug-related themes. Some of his works have gone on to be adapted to films (and series) garnering much acclaim, such as the 1982 Ridley Scott film Blade Runner, which was an adaptation of Dick's 1968 novel Do Androids Dream of Electric Sheep?, released three months posthumously. The only adaptation released in his lifetime was a 1962 episode of the British TV series Out of This World, based on Dick's 1953 short story "Impostor".

Other works such as the films Total Recall, Minority Report and A Scanner Darkly have also gone on to critical or commercial success, while the television series The Man in the High Castle adapted to long-form television successfully. Following the success of Netflix's science fiction short story series Black Mirror, and its own success with The Man in the High Castle, in 2017 streaming service Amazon Prime Video paired up with Channel 4 to produce a series of short stories originally released between 1953 and 1955, under the series title Philip K. Dick's Electric Dreams, the only adaptation bearing the author's own name.

The following is a list of film and television adaptations of Dick's writings:

Source work			Film Adaptation			TV Adaptation	
Title	Published	Type	Title	Released	Director	Series or Episode Title	Aired
"The Hood Maker"	1953	Short story			Julian Jarrold	Philip K. Dick's Electric Dreams episode 'The Hood Maker'	2017
"The Commuter"	1953	Short story			Tom Harper	Philip K. Dick's Electric Dreams episode 'The Commuter'	2017
"The Hanging Stranger"	1953	Short story			Dee Rees	Philip K. Dick's Electric Dreams episode 'Kill All Others'	2017
"Second Variety"	1953	Short story	Screamers Screamers: The Hunting	1995 2009	Christian Duguay Sheldon Wilson		
"Paycheck"	1953	Short story	Paycheck	2003	John Woo		
"Impostor"	1953	Short story	Impostor	2001	Gary Fleder	Out of This World episode, adapted by Terry Nation	1962
"Sales Pitch"	1954	Short story			Marc Munden	Philip K. Dick's Electric Dreams episode 'Crazy Diamond'	2017
"Exhibit Piece"	1954	Short story			Jeffrey Reiner	Philip K. Dick's Electric Dreams Philip K. Dick's Electric Dreams episode 'Real Life'	2017
"The Father Thing"	1954	Short story			Michael Dinner	Philip K. Dick's Electric Dreams episode 'The Father Thing'	2017
"Adjustment Team"	1954	Short story	The Adjustment Bureau	2011	George Nolfi		
"The Golden Man"	1954	Short story	Next	2007	Lee Tamahori		
"The Crystal Crypt"	1954	Short story	The Crystal Crypt	2013	Shahab Zargari		
"The Impossible Planet"	1955	Short story			David Farr	Philip K. Dick's Electric Dreams episode 'The Impossible Planet'	2017
"Human Is"	1955	Short story			Francesca Gregorini	Philip K. Dick's Electric Dreams episode 'Human Is'	2017
"Autofac"	1955	Short story			Peter Horton	Philip K. Dick's Electric Dreams episode 'Autofac'	2017
"Foster, You're Dead!"	1955	Short story			Alan Taylor	Philip K. Dick's Electric Dreams episode 'Safe and Sound'	2017
The Minority Report	1956	Novella	Minority Report	2002	Steven Spielberg	Minority Report	2015
The Man in the High Castle	1962	Novel			David Semel	The Man in the High Castle	2015
"We Can Remember It for You Wholesale"	1966	Short story	Total Recall Total Recall	1990 2012	Paul Verhoeven Len Wiseman	Total Recall 2070	1999
Do Androids Dream of Electric Sheep?	1968	Novel	Blade Runner Blade Runner 2049	1982 2017	Ridley Scott Denis Villeneuve	Blade Runner 2099	2026
Confessions of a Crap Artist	1975	Novel	Confessions d'un Barjo	1992	Jérôme Boivin		
Radio Free Albemuth	1976	Novel	Radio Free Albemuth	2010	John Alan Simon		
A Scanner Darkly	1977	Novel	A Scanner Darkly	2006	Richard Linklater		
