= Commuter (disambiguation) =

A commuter is an individual who regularly travels between home and work.

Commuter(s) or The Commuter(s) may also refer to:

== Arts and entertainment ==
- "The Commuter" (short story), a 1953 science fiction story by Philip K. Dick
  - "The Commuter" (Electric Dreams), a 2017 TV episode adaptation of the story
- The Commuter (film), a 2018 thriller film starring Liam Neeson
- The Commuters, a 1915 play by James Forbes
- The Commuters, a 1915 silent film comedy, based on the play
- Commuters, a 1988 film featuring Barbora Bobuľová
- Commuter, performer of the song "Young Hearts" for the soundtrack of the 1984 film The Karate Kid

== Transport ==
- Commuter (Iarnród Éireann), a brand of suburban rail services in Ireland
- Commuter Airlines, a defunct commuter airline based in Binghamton, New York
- Commuter Cars, an American company that produced the prototype vehicle Commuter Cars Tango
- Commuter Vehicles, a 1970s American company that produced the Citicar
- KAI Commuter, a commuter rail services company in Jakarta, Indonesia
- Tonggeun, translated on timetables as "Commuter", a class of train in South Korea
- Toyota HiAce, a van known as Commuter in some countries
- The Commuter (train), a passenger train operated by the Chicago & North Western

== Other uses ==
- Commuter Security Group, a Swedish security guard company
