= Screamers (1995 film) =

- Theatrical release poster
- Directed by: Christian Duguay
- Screenplay by: Dan O'Bannon; Miguel Tejada-Flores
- Based on: "Second Variety" by Philip K. Dick
- Produced by: Franco Battista; Tom Berry
- Starring: Peter Weller; Roy Dupuis; Jennifer Rubin; Andy Lauer
- Cinematography: Rodney Gibbons
- Edited by: Yves Langlois
- Music by: Normand Corbeil
- Distributed by: Triumph Films; Columbia Pictures
- Release dates: September 8, 1995 (Toronto); January 26, 1996 (United States)
- Running time: 108 minutes
- Countries: Canada; United States; Japan
- Language: English
- Budget: $14 million
- Box office: $5.7 million

Screamers is a 1995 science fiction horror film starring Peter Weller, Roy Dupuis, and Jennifer Rubin, and directed by Christian Duguay. The screenplay, written by Dan O'Bannon with a rewrite by Miguel Tejada-Flores, is based on Philip K. Dick's 1953 short story "Second Variety", and addresses themes commonly found in that author's work: societal conflict, confusion of reality and illusion, and machines turning upon their creators. The film received generally negative response from critics at the time of its release. A sequel Screamers: The Hunting, was released in 2009, to mixed reviews.

== Plot ==
In the year 2078, the planet Sirius 6B, once a thriving mining hub, has been reduced to a toxic wasteland by a war between the mining company the New Economic Block (N.E.B.) and "The Alliance", a group of former mining and science personnel. A fragile stalemate is in effect between the two exhausted, poorly-supplied, and undermanned armies. The vast empty areas between the two sides are patrolled by Autonomous Mobile Swords (AMS)—AI-powered robots developed by Alliance scientists. Nicknamed "Screamers" after their signature high-pitched noise, they target creatures with a heartbeat. Alliance soldiers wear "tabs" that disguise their heartbeats, rendering them invisible to the machines.

An N.E.B. soldier carrying a message to the Alliance compound is killed by screamers. The message guarantees safe passage through N.E.B. territory to discuss a truce. Alliance commanding officer Joe Hendricksson reports this development to his Earth-based superiors, but is told to disregard it as peace negotiations are already underway on Earth. Private "Ace" Jefferson, the only survivor of a crash of a transport newly arrived from Earth, rebuts this claim. Hendricksson is not surprised; he has long suspected that both sides have simply written off Sirius 6B and abandoned their armies.

Deciding that the truce is their only chance of survival, Hendricksson, accompanied by Jefferson, sets out to meet the N.E.B. commander. While traveling through a ruined city they come upon David, a young boy clutching a teddy bear. Unwilling to abandon a defenseless civilian, they bring him along. The following night, they are attacked by a new "Type 1" screamer model immune to the tabs, alarming Hendricksson.

As the group nears the N.E.B. compound, two enemy soldiers, Becker and Ross, open fire on David, who explodes in a shower of bolts and gears. Alliance men are shocked to learn that he was a "Type 3" screamer. Most of the N.E.B. contingent has been wiped out by another "David" screamer that a patrol unwittingly brought into the base. Becker, Ross, and a black marketeer named Jessica are the only survivors.

The group heads to the N.E.B. command center but finds it abandoned. Locating the mainframe computer, Hendricksson learns that the N.E.B. truce offer was just as false as the Alliance message from Earth. Hendricksson sees a "type 1" downloading information from the mainframe. He attempts to query the mainframe for "type 2" but approaching "Davids" force them to retreat. Back at the N.E.B. bunker, the knowledge of Screamers creating new versions that are indistinguishable from humans makes everyone paranoid. Becker becomes convinced that Ross is a screamer and kills him, only to discover that he was human.

The four survivors retreat to the Alliance base, only to find that it has been taken over by "Davids". As dozens of "Davids" pour out of the bunker's entrance, Hendricksson wipes them out with a micro-nuclear missile. Jefferson rushes to help Becker, who was apparently injured in the blast. However, Becker reveals himself to be a "type 2" and kills Jefferson. After Hendricksson destroys Becker, only he and Jessica remain. Worrying that Jessica could be a screamer, Hendricksson cuts her hand and is relieved to see blood.

The pair locate an emergency escape shuttle, but discover that it only seats one. Hendricksson offers the spot for Jessica but a second "Jessica" arrives, revealing that she is another, even more human-like model of screamer. Hendricksson resigns himself to death, but to his surprise, Jessica shields him, battles her lookalike, and is fatally wounded. The spacecraft's engines kick on and destroy the second "Jessica". With her last breath, the original Jessica confesses her love for Hendricksson, who departs for Earth with the teddy bear carried by the first "David".

As the screen fades to black, the bear slowly begins moving.

== Cast ==
- Peter Weller as Commander Joseph A. Hendricksson
- Jennifer Rubin as Jessica Hansen
- Andrew Lauer as Private Michael "Ace" Jefferson
- Ron White as Lieutenant Commander Chuck Elbarak
- Charles Powell as Private Ross
- Roy Dupuis as Marshal Richard Cooper / Private Becker
- Michael Caloz as David
- Liliana Komorowska as Private Landowska
- Jason Cavalier as Private Leone
- Leni Parker as Corporal McDonald
- Bruce Boa as Secretary Green

== Production ==
Screamers was stuck in development hell for over a decade before finally being produced. Screenwriter Dan O'Bannon had completed his adaptation of Dick's short story "Second Variety" in 1981 (along with his adaptation of another of Dick's short stories, "We Can Remember It For You Wholesale", which became the 1990 film Total Recall). By 1983, O'Bannon's screenplay for Screamers had been optioned by Tom Naud (SFX designer on the 1981 film Outland). However, the production never went ahead as planned. At various times, Charles Fries showed interest in the project, but it was not until the 1990s that Screamers went into production. By this time the screenplay had been rewritten by Miguel Tejada-Flores. O'Bannon was unaware that the film had been made until after its release, when his agent called him to notify him of his screenwriting credit for the film. According to O'Bannon, they had kept much of the plot and characters from his original script the same while changing much of the dialogue.

The film, directed by Christian Duguay, was made in Canada. Locations included a quarry in Quebec, in Montreal's Olympic Stadium, as well as Joliette.

Actor Peter Weller called Screamers a "terrific movie" in a 2019 interview with The After Movie Diner and added that he "had one of the most fantastic times I've ever had making that movie". He continued, "I'm really proud of [it]. Even though we changed the circumstances, it still has the feel, dedication, drive and theme" of Philip K. Dick's "Second Variety".

== Release ==
It premiered at the 1995 Toronto International Film Festival on September 8, 1995. It was released in the United States on January 26, 1996, by Columbia Pictures.

== Reception ==
=== Box office ===
The film was not a commercial success. It earned about $5.7 million in the United States and Canada. It was moderately popular in France, Japan, and the Netherlands. The worldwide box office was approximately $7 million against a $14 million budget.

=== Critical response ===
The film holds a 29% approval rating on Rotten Tomatoes based on 34 reviews.

James Berardinelli gave the film a positive review, awarding it a rating of three stars (out of four). Berardinelli said that the film "oozes atmosphere" and "underlines an important truth: you don't need a big budget or big-name stars to make this sort of motion picture succeed." Joe Bob Briggs also reacted positively, calling Screamers "a pretty dang decent [movie]" and saying, "I loved it. ... Three and a half stars."

Roger Ebert gave the film two and a half stars (out of four), remarking that it was "made with a certain imagination and intelligence," "the dialogue is often effective," and "what makes the film somewhat intriguing is its Blade Runner-like ambiguity: who is, and who isn't, a human being."

Time Out New York Film Guide criticized director Christian Duguay's "flashy, aimless direction", saying that the movie "lacks the intelligence to follow through its grim premise", but added that the film "does offer many ... guilty pleasures" and "the design and effects teams have lent scale and impact to the futuristic locations and sets."

The Science Fiction, Horror, and Fantasy Film Review gave Screamers three stars out of four, calling it a "two-thirds excellent and intelligent science-fiction film" that "builds towards a climax that never arrives ... After an impressive build-up, the film blows its third act and falls into cliches." Popcorn Pictures gave the film two and a half stars out of four, writing: "Screamers isn't terrible. The scenes inside the refinery are creepy enough with them stalking and being stalked by the Screamers. But the intro and finale are terrible ways to start and end a film respectively. There was a good film waiting to come out here, it's a shame only half of it did."

Rob Blackwelder of SplicedWire said, "Screamers is inundated with movie clichés, stock characters, stolen premises and scenes that just don't make sense." Beyond Hollywood wrote, "One of the biggest problems with Screamers is the near absence of a likeable character, or at least someone who we actually give a damn about escaping those slice-and-dice robots. ... There's no doubt Screamers could have been a lot better than it is. The whole sequence at the refinery is the best of the movie, managing to elicit both a couple of scare scenes and a lot of creepiness. The rest, unfortunately, doesn't live up to that middle section."

== Awards ==
Year	Group	Award	Nominee	Result
1996	Genie Awards	Best Achievement in Art Direction/Production Design	Perri	Nominated
1996	Genie Awards	Best Achievement in Music – Original Score	Normand Corbeil	Nominated
1996	Genie Awards	Best Performance by an Actor in a Supporting Role	Ron White	Nominated

== Sequel ==
Screamers: The Hunting, directed by Sheldon Wilson and starring Gina Holden, Jana Pallaske, Greg Bryk, Stephen Amell and Lance Henriksen, was released straight to DVD in 2009.

The sequel is set several years after the events of the original film. Hendricksson died when he deliberately allowed his escape shuttle to burn up in the atmosphere during reentry to Earth. The official determination is that he committed suicide due to post-traumatic stress; but it is strongly implied that he actually did it to prevent the "teddy bear" screamer on board from reaching Earth. Meanwhile, an SOS signal arrives from Sirius 6B. A contingent of seven soldiers, including Hendricksson's daughter Victoria Bronte (Holden), is dispatched to the war torn mining planet to investigate. The film features all of the screamers from the original film, as well as a sleeker, longer, and more serpentine screamer with cutting mandibles for a mouth.

As with Screamers, critical reaction to Screamers: The Hunting was mixed. David Johnson of DVD Verdict wrote that "the visual effects were surprisingly effective" and "[p]ractical effects impress as well", but added, "Unfortunately ... the script defaults to a clichéd finale, and a predictable—though well-executed—final twist ending." He concluded, "I had a pretty decent time with [Screamers: The Hunting] ... [I]f you're hankering for a serving of effective sci-fi B-movie shenanigans, you could do a lot worse." Scott Foy of Dread Central wrote, "They've basically recycled the first film but dumbed it and dulled it down considerably, doing away with the paranoia and sense of desolation that gave the original some spark in favor of logic gaps and tedious predictability. ... The best that can be said ... is that most of the production values and make-up effects are top notch for a direct-to-DVD production. Too bad they didn't put as much work into crafting the screenplay."

== See also ==
- Grey goo scenario
- Self-reconfiguring modular robot
- List of adaptations of works by Philip K. Dick
