= Jerry Leggio =

American actor (1935–2025)

- Born: Jerome Philip Leggio Jr. September 23, 1935; Baton Rouge, Louisiana, U.S.
- Died: October 1, 2025 (aged 90); Baton Rouge, Louisiana, U.S.
- Occupation: Actor

Jerome Philip Leggio Jr. (September 23, 1935 – October 1, 2025) was an American actor.

== Life and career ==
Leggio was born in Baton Rouge, Louisiana, on September 23, 1935.

He appeared in such films as Sounder, Sister, Sister, The Badge, and American Violet and in two episodes of In the Heat of the Night. Leggio also appeared in two episodes of American Horror Story: Freak Show as Dr. Bonham and in the television films The Ernest Green Story, Ruffian and Mothman. He had uncredited roles in the films Hush...Hush, Sweet Charlotte and Alvarez Kelly. His stage roles included The Best Little Whorehouse in Texas (as Sheriff Dodd), A Streetcar Named Desire (as Stanley), A Few Good Men (as Colonel Jessup), Inherit the Wind (as Henry Drummond), The King and I (as the King), Camelot (as King Arthur) and The Sound of Music (as Captain Von Trapp).

In 2015, Leggio guest starred in an episode of Scream Queens.

Leggio died on October 1, 2025, at the age of 90 at his home in Baton Rouge.

== Filmography ==
=== Film ===
Year	Title	Role	Notes
1964	Hush...Hush, Sweet Charlotte	Doctor	Uncredited
1966	Alvarez Kelly	Telegrapher	Uncredited
1967	Hurry Sundown	Doctor	Uncredited
1987	Sister, Sister	Mr. Bonnard	
1989	Blaze	Photographer	
1996	Heaven's Prisoners	Doctor	Uncredited
2001	Malpractice	Ackerman	
2002	The Badge	Henry	
2008	American Violet	Norman	
2008	Middle of Nowhere	Judge	
2009	LA-308 Assassin Redemption	Deacon	
2010	The Terror Experiment	Dr. Andzari	
2014	Barefoot	Elderly Husband 2	
2017	Speech & Debate	Ted Burns	
2022	Days of Daisy	Dr. Mason	

=== Television ===
Year	Title	Role	Notes
1974	The Autobiography of Miss Jane Pittman	Carpetbagger	Television film
1975	The Deadly Tower	Mr. Valchex	Television film
1977	The Life and Assassination of the Kingfish	Jack Williamson	Television film
1978	Superdome	Coach	Television film
1978	Murder at the Mardi Gras	Policeman #1	Television film
1978	Big Bob Johnson and His Fantastic Speed Circus	Businessman	Television film
1978	A Woman Called Moses	Coleman's Man #3	2 episodes
1979	The Night Rider	Preacher	Television film
1982	Rascals and Robbers: The Secret Adventures of Tom Sawyer and Huckleberry Finn	Farmer	Television film
1983	The Mississippi	Snacks	Episode: "We Remember, We Revere"
1984	Louisiana	Banker	Television film
1984	Hot Pursuit	Charlie	Episode: "Pilot"
1986	If Tomorrow Comes	Policeman	Miniseries
1988	In the Heat of the Night	Harry Giles	2 episodes
1989	Margaret Bourke-White	Reporter #6	Television film
1989	False Witness	Dr. Melvin	Television film
1991	Doublecrossed	Judge Altzo	Television film
1992	Dangerous Curves	David Larkin	2 episodes
1993	The Ernest Green Story	Mayor Mann	Television film
1993	House of Secrets	Deputy Coroner	Television film
1995	Jake Lassiter: Justice on the Bayou	Morris McGonigal	Television film
1995	Kingfish: A Story of Huey P. Long	Farley's aide	Television film
1997	Old Man	Warden	Television film
1997	Orleans	Governor	Episode: "Luther's Temptation"
2004	Infidelity	Doctor	Television film
2004	Torn Apart	Hastings	Television film
2005	Faith of My Fathers	Other Captain	Television film
2006	A Perfect Day	Old Man	Television film
2007	Ruffian	Lucien Laurin	Television film
2009	Tribute	Ice cream parlor owner	Television film
2010	Quantum Apocalypse	Dr. Zulkowski	Television film
2010	Mothman	Frank Waverly	Television film
2010	Memphis Beat	Dr. Thomas Burke	Episode: "I Want to Be Free"
2011	Hide	Mr. Eola	Television film
2014	American Horror Story: Freak Show	Dr. Bonham	2 episodes
2015	Scream Queens	Wellington	Episode: "Thanksgiving"
