= Carny (2009 film) =

- US DVD cover
- Genre: Horror
- Written by: Douglas G. Davis
- Directed by: Sheldon Wilson
- Starring: Lou Diamond Phillips; Alan C. Peterson
- Country of origin: Canada
- Original language: English

Production
- Producers: Nancy Boucher; Sandrine Gros d'Aillon; Irene Litinsky
- Cinematography: Danny Nowak
- Running time: 88 minutes
- Production companies: Muse Entertainment Enterprises; RHI Entertainment

Original release
- Network: Syfy
- Release: April 25, 2009

Carny (known in Australia as Jersey Devil) is a 2009 Canadian television horror film by Syfy and the seventeenth film in the Maneater film series. The film was directed by Sheldon Wilson and stars Lou Diamond Phillips.

== Plot ==
A large, winged creature is delivered to a traveling carnival. Ringmaster Cap kills the person who sold him the beast before he and his assistant Quinn tranquilize it with darts.

Sheriff Atlas comes to investigate Cap's carnival under a paranoid pastor's requests. During the carnival's opening show, the pastor's son Taylor and his friend Jesse are unimpressed by the beast and start throwing peanuts at it. Furious, the beast breaks free from its cage and begins terrorizing the carnival before escaping into the woods.

The following night, Taylor and Jesse hide in an old barn in the forest when a dog feeding off of a severed foot barks at them, alerting the beast to their location. The beast chases and kills the dog as Taylor and Jesse escape and get separated; the beast eventually kills Taylor as Jesse hides in an old car. The next day, Jesse is found by Atlas and his team. Atlas and his deputy find the remains of the man who sold the beast near the river, having been cut rather than mauled by the beast, determining it to be a homicide. Atlas visits psychic carnie Samara and learns of the beast's true origins: the Jersey Devil, the monstrous thirteenth child of Mrs. Leeds, whose aggression is fueled by the scent and taste of blood. Meanwhile, when Jesse and his mother are driving through the forest, the creature attacks and kills them.

Meanwhile, Atlas organizes a hunting party to hunt the creature down. Cap and Quinn, the former of whom wants the creature alive to deliver it to a client, later try to recapture it by using more darts, eventually running into Atlas and his deputy. When Atlas leaves to hunt the creature on his own, Cap tranquilizes Atlas's deputy and then has Quinn stab him to attract the beast with the smell of blood. However, the deputy shoots at the approaching creature and sends it fleeing before succumbing to his wounds. The beast then attacks Cap's carnival, only managing to kill one carnie before being driven off by Atlas. Cap stabs Quinn to death to attract the beast with the latter's blood. The beast arrives and attacks Cap, who strikes back with new, upgraded darts that knock it out.

Cap returns to the carnival and is arrested by Atlas, who discovered part of a dart in his deputy's back. The pastor, who wants revenge on the beast and the carnival for Taylor's death, knocks Atlas unconscious and locks him up. The pastor then cuts out Cap's tongue and prepares to finish him off. However, the beast, having awakened and sensing blood, arrives at the police station and kills Cap. After failing to shoot it, the pastor stabs the beast with two darts, knocking it out once again. Believing it to be dead, he and his followers load the creature's body onto their truck, go to the carnival, and begin to burn it down, killing most of the carnies. As the carnage unfolds, the beast awakens and kills the pastor.

Atlas regains consciousness, frees himself from his cell and goes to the now burning carnival, attempting to rescue Samara. The beast eventually chases them down, resulting in Atlas losing his gun and getting separated from Samara. Samara is chased to a Ferris wheel where a carnie dies attempting to stop the beast. Atlas rams the beast with a car and pins it against the Ferris wheel, which eventually collapses on both of them. Though this kills the beast, Atlas is fatally injured and dies afterward.

== Cast ==
- Lou Diamond Phillips as Atlas
- Simone-Élise Girard as Samara
- Alan C. Peterson as Cap
- Vlasta Vrána as Pastor Owen
- Matt Murray as Taylor
- Rick Genest as Carny
