= Spitting Off Tall Buildings =

German punk rock band

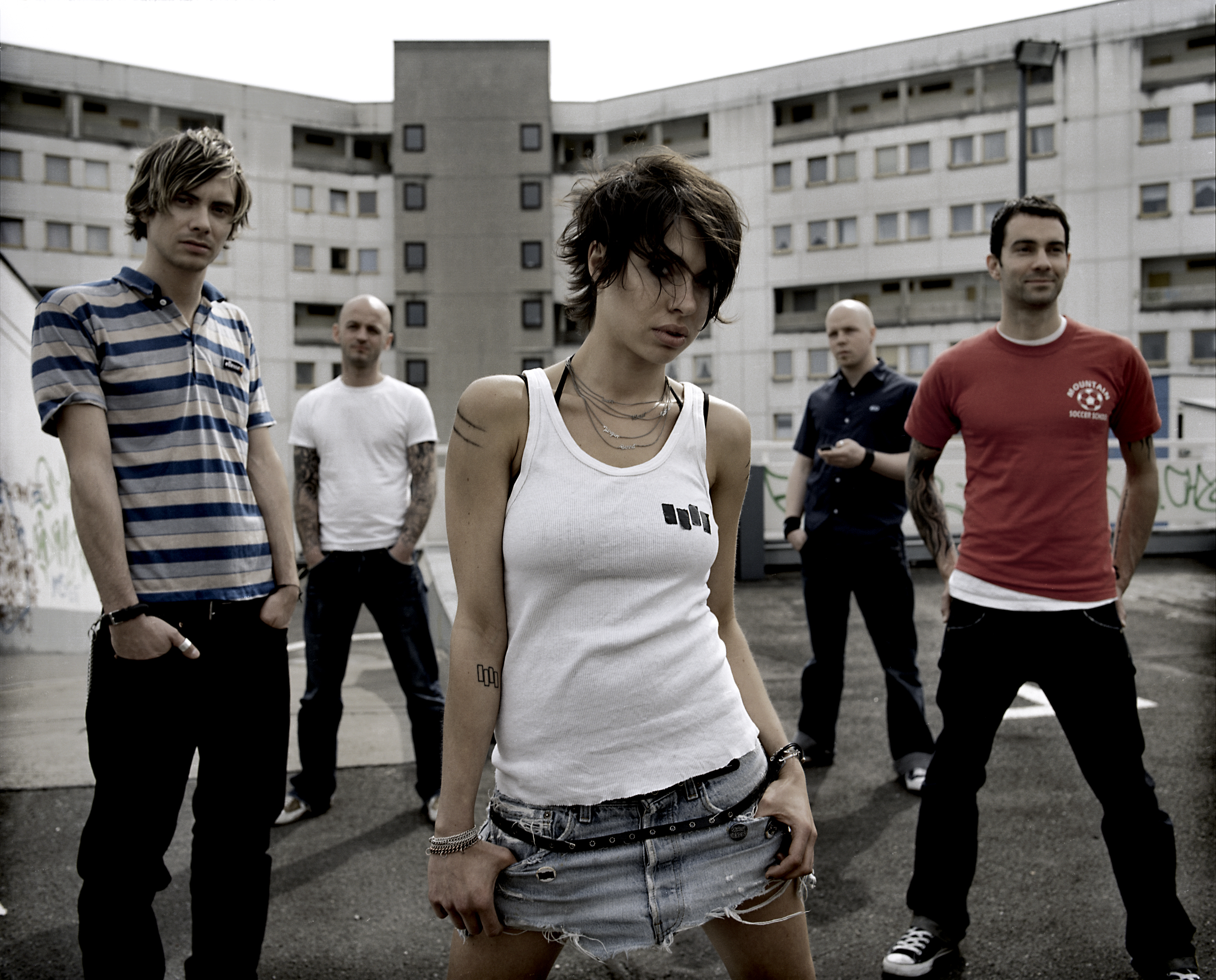
- Spitting Off Tall Buildings / Photo by Erik Weiss

Background information
- Origin: Berlin, Treptow, Germany
- Genres: Punk rock
- Years active: 2002–2007
- Labels: Sanctuary; Exile on Mainstream
- Members: Jana Pallaske; Gregor Albrecht; Paul Radermacher; Niels Eberle
- Website: spittingofftallbuildings.de

Spitting Off Tall Buildings was a Berlin Punk rock band headlined by the former VJ and actress Jana Pallaske (vocals), who assumed the stage name Bonnie Riot.

== Career ==
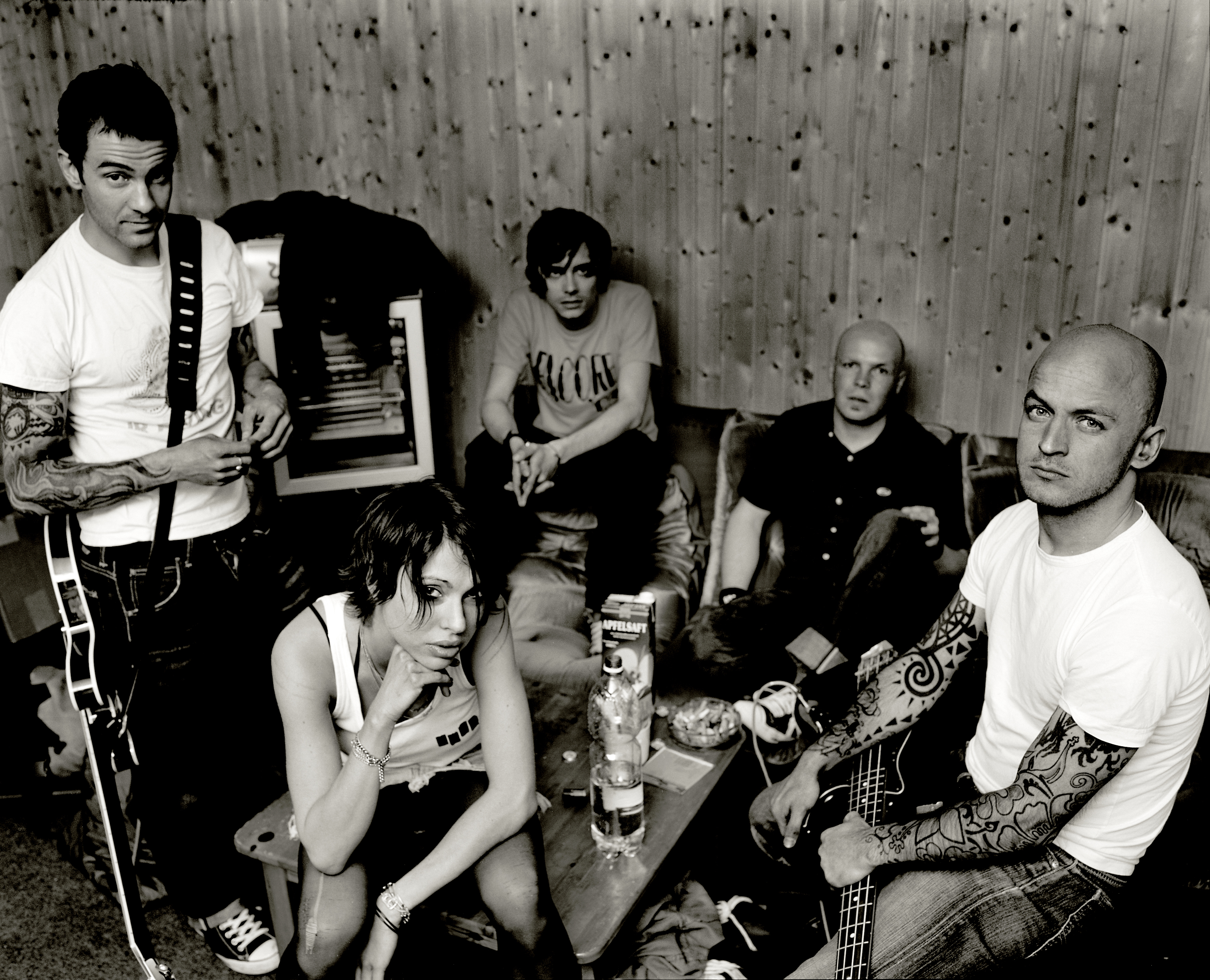
Spitting Off Tall Buildings Band

Pallaske and Radermacher founded the band in 2002. In 2003, they were joined by Jürgens, Albrecht and Eberle, also from Treptow, where they met her. They recorded their first EP and played their first show in 2004. During one of their first concerts, they met Moses Schneider, a music producer known for his work with Tocotronic and Beatsteaks. They soon signed with Sanctuary Records and released their debut album, Spitting Off Tall Buildings, on 30 September 2005. Moses produced their live recordings while Gordon Raphael, previously known for his work with The Strokes, produced the studio version. The album was mixed by Michael Ilbert of Sweden, who had worked with The Hives, The Hellacopters and Fireside.

The band's name is the title of a novel by American author Dan Fante.

Following the release of their second album, Good Night And Good Luck, on the label Exile On Mainstream on 11 May 2007, the band announced their separation (in late 2007). The album was recorded in a week at Electrical Audio in Chicago and was produced by Steve Albini.

== Discography ==
=== Studio albums ===
- 2005: Spitting Off Tall Buildings (Sanctuary Records)
- 2007: Good Night And Good Luck (Exile on Mainstream)

=== Live albums ===
- 2004: Spitting Off Tall Buildings (Self-distribution)
