= Kaw (film) =

2007 made-for-television film

- Promotional release poster
- Written by: Benjamin Sztajnkrycer
- Directed by: Sheldon Wilson
- Starring: Sean Patrick Flanery; Kristin Booth; Stephen McHattie; Rod Taylor
- Music by: Steve London
- Countries of origin: Canada; United States
- Original language: English

Production
- Producer: Gordon Yang
- Running time: 92 minutes
- Budget: CA$1.8 million

Original release
- Network: Sci Fi Channel
- Release: 2007

Kaw is a 2007 made-for-television horror film directed by Sheldon Wilson and starring Sean Patrick Flanery, Stephen McHattie, Kristin Booth, and Rod Taylor. An international co-production of Canada and the United States, Kaw is a Sci Fi Pictures original film. The film's plot, which follows a town besieged by hostile ravens, is similar to that of The Birds (1963)—which also starred Taylor—and has been called an homage or modernization of the older film.

== Plot ==
A shunned farmer attempts to warn his neighbors of an impending besiegement by crazed ravens. A small town sheriff and the trapped citizens of the town must band together to survive.

After one of the farmer's cows catches mad cow disease, it dies. Soon another cow catches it and dies as well. Instead of telling the authorities about it, the farmer chooses to keep quiet thinking he could handle the situation and for fear of the authorities killing his cattle. Ravens feed on the infected cow carcasses, and the disease begins to affect the birds as well. The farmer tries to burn the corpses in hopes to drive the birds away. However, it only makes them angrier until they decided to attack the townspeople.

== Cast ==
- Sean Patrick Flanery as Wayne
- Stephen McHattie as Clyde
- Kristin Booth as Cynthia
- Rod Taylor as Doc
- John Ralston as Oskar
- Michèle Duquet as Betty
- Ashley Newbrough as Doris
- Gray Powell as Stanley "Stan"
- Vladmir Bondarenko as Jacob
- Megan Park as Gretchen
- Emma Knight as Connie
- Amanda Brugel as Emma
- Wendy Lyon as Luanne
- Sophie Gendron as Tricia
- Jefferson Brown as John
- Renessa Blitz as Rachel
- David Gardner as Rolf
- Alexander Conti as Tyler Whitmore
- Jen Lawson as Tyler's Mother

== Production ==
Kaw was shot in Hamilton, Ontario, Canada, in December 2005, on a CA$1.8 million budget, with filming taking place on the same soundstage on which the television series The Hilarious House of Frightenstein was filmed. The production of Kaw utilized 11 live ravens from the Czech Republic, which were supplemented in post-production with numerous additional birds created using computer-generated imagery (CGI).

== Reception ==
Andy Cooper of The Leader-Post gave the film a score of two-and-a-half out of five stars, writing, "It's not a classic, but the bird attacks are well done thanks to some very well trained ravens from Czechoslovakia aided by thousands of computer generated birds." Felix Vasquez Jr. of Cinema Crazed called the film "surprisingly competent", and an "atmospheric little killer bird movie that works and works well."

== See also ==
- List of natural horror films
