= Ruffian (film) =

- Written by: Jim Burnstein; Garrett K. Schiff
- Directed by: Yves Simoneau
- Starring: Sam Shepard; Laura Bailey; Frank Whaley; Nicholas Pryor; Christine Belford
- Music by: Lawrence Shragge
- Original language: English

Production
- Producers: Orly Adelson; Kimberly C. Anderson
- Cinematography: David Franco
- Editor: Michael D. Ornstein
- Running time: 89 minutes
- Production company: ESPN Films

Original release
- Network: ABC
- Release: June 9, 2007

Ruffian is a 2007 American television film that tells the story of the U.S. Racing Hall of Fame Champion Thoroughbred filly Ruffian who went undefeated until her death after breaking down in a nationally televised match race at Belmont Park on July 6, 1975, against the Kentucky Derby winner, Foolish Pleasure.

Made by ESPN Original Entertainment, the film is directed by Yves Simoneau and stars Sam Shepard as Ruffian's trainer, Frank Whiteley. The producers used four different geldings in the role of Ruffian. Locations for the 2007 film included Louisiana Downs in Shreveport, Louisiana and Belmont Park in Elmont, New York.

Ruffian was first broadcast on June 9, 2007, on the ABC television network. The DVD was released on June 12, 2007.

Previously, ESPN Classic had broadcast a special on July 6, 2000, to mark the twenty-fifth anniversary of the death of Ruffian.

This movie is also one of Laura Bailey's only major live action roles.

== Cast ==
- Sam Shepard as Frank Whiteley
- Frank Whaley as Bill Nack
- Laura Bailey as Cassie
- Nicholas Pryor as Stuart Janney
- Christine Belford as Barbara Janney
- Mathew Greer as Dan Williams
- Louis Herthum as Dr. Harthill
- John McConnell as Tony Pappas
- Michael Harding as LeRoy Jolley
- Stuart Greer as Dan Lasater
- Jon Stafford as Dr. Pendergrast
- David Dwyer as Dick Sandler
- Bill Flynn as Elder Reporter
- Keith Flippen as Dinny Phipps
- Jerry Leggio as Lucien Laurin
- Vladimir Diaz as Jacinto Vásquez
- Joel Santiago as Vincent Bracciale
- Francisco Torres as Braulio Baeza
- Dave Johnson as himself (track announcer)
- Gary McKillips as Jack

== See also ==
- List of films about horses
- List of films about horse racing
