= Mothman (film) =

2010 horror television film

- DVD cover
- Genre: Horror
- Written by: Sonny Lee; Patrick Walsh
- Directed by: Sheldon Wilson
- Starring: Jewel Staite; Connor Fox
- Theme music composer: Steve London
- Country of origin: United States
- Original language: English

Production
- Producer: Brad Krevoy
- Cinematography: John Tarver, CSC
- Editor: Marie-Lou Gingras
- Running time: 91 minutes

Original release
- Network: Syfy
- Release: April 24, 2010

Mothman is a 2010 television film directed by Sheldon Wilson and starring Jewel Staite and Connor Fox. The film premiered on Syfy on April 24, 2010, and was released on DVD on October 25, 2011. The film features the song "Fuel" by Surfact in the end credits and on the DVD menu. The film received negative reviews.

== Plot ==
In Point Pleasant, West Virginia, a group of high school seniors camp next to a river near an old mill where the Mothman is supposedly buried under the incinerators. While pranking their friend Jamie, the teenagers accidentally drown him. They cover up the accident by hitting his head post-mortem with a rock, claiming Jamie hit his head jumping into the river.

Ten years later, one of the teenagers, Katherine Grant, works as a Washington Weekly reporter. Being tasked with covering the tenth Mothman Festival, Katherine returns to Point Pleasant. She meets her ex-boyfriend Derek Carpenter and later reunites with the rest of the group who accidentally killed Jamie. Jared leaves and heads back to his RV, where he is murdered by the Mothman.

The next day, Katherine and Derek head to Jared's RV but fails to find him. At the Mothman Festival, they meet a blind old man named Frank Waverly who warns them that Mothman will strike again. Later that night at the bar, Richard, almost commits suicide over Jamie's death, but changes his mind at the last minute. However, the Mothman enters through a mirror and kills Richard. The Mothman then brutally murders Sally in her car.

The next day, Katherine, who is now starting to believe the legend, comes to Frank for help. Frank tells Katherine of how Point Pleasant was home to an evil spirit. When the white settlers massacred the Indians and tortured their chief Cornstalk. The dying Cornstalk summoned the evil spirit to take revenge on any murderers in the area. The whites cut Cornstalk in pieces and put them in a mirror-lined coffin. Hence, the spirit of Mothman can only enter the world through reflective surfaces.

Katherine heads back to her motel room, where Mothman emerges from the television screen and attacks her. Derek arrives and wards off the Mothman. They go to Frank, who admits to blinding himself because he and two of his friends accidentally killed the mayor's son while driving drunk.

After discovering Jared's remains at his RV, Casey is attacked by the Mothman. He escapes and calls Derek. Frank gives Katherine and her friends a bone-like object to perform a banishing ritual to stop the Mothman.

Katherine, Derek, and Casey head to the old mill and perform the banishing ritual near an incinerator. However, the banishing ritual actually appears to summon the Mothman, which chases Katherine and Derek through the mill. Just as the Mothman corners Katherine and Derek, Casey shoots him and the creature flies off. As Katherine and Derek attempt to escape, Casey shoots at the Mothman again and is carried away by the creature as Katherine and Derek leave.

Katherine and Derek arrive at Frank's where he traps them in a tunnel cornered by the Mothman; Frank explains that it was his little brother who died in the car accident and, to protect the other boys involved in the car accident, he alone was punished by the town. Katherine and Derek eventually escape and find Casey, who is alive.

The three head to the Mothman Festival that night where Frank is planning on the Mothman taking revenge on the entire town. Frank arrives at the festival where all of the attendants spot the Mothman in the sky as he attacks a woman on a Ferris wheel. Katherine and Derek arrive at the scene where Frank is killed by the Mothman, as well as the mayor who shoots at the Mothman. Casey rams the Mothman with his car and attempts to kill the creature. However, the Mothman kills Casey and prepares to kill Katherine. Katherine fires her gun at the Mothman, which sets off an explosion that seems to kill the Mothman. However, the Mothman is still alive and again prepares to kill Katherine. Derek distracts the Mothman until the creature carries him off and drops him. The Mothman then prepares to finally kill Katherine. Katherine stabs the Mothman with the bone-like object which causes the Mothman to burst into flames and black moths.

The next day, Katherine visits Derek, who is wounded and in a hospital. Katherine's eyes turn red and black moths fly from her. She is seemingly possessed by the Mothman and is preparing to kill Derek. As the scene closes, a black moth bursts into flames and turns into the Mothman's glowing red eyes.

== Cast ==
- Jewel Staite as Katharine Grant
- Connor Fox as Derek Carpenter
- Susie Abromeit as Mindy
- Michael Aills as Jared
- Matty Ferraro as Casey
- Jerry Leggio as Frank Waverly
- T.W. Leshner as Richard
- Jessica Erin Sylvia as Sally
- Alex Hardee as Jamie

== Reception ==
The film received generally negative reviews. Horrorreviews.net said: "It pretty much fails miserably on all accounts but dammit…I was entertained by this f*cker! That’s the only reason I’m giving it a two out of five shroud rating. It deserves a zero, of that there is no doubt. But I’m a sucker for craptacular stuff like this."

Shiversofhorror.com gave the film 2 stars out of 5 and said: "Given that this seems to be a SyFy original movie its not as bad as some of the other shit I’ve seen by them. But had I known it was theirs I honestly wouldn’t have bothered renting it. Their movies are a joke. But, if you like their stuff, have at it. I’ve seen a LOT worse in general, thus the reason this gets 2 stars instead of 1."
