= Red: Werewolf Hunter =

2010 Canadian television film

- Genre: Action; horror; dark fantasy
- Screenplay by: Brook Durham
- Story by: Angela Mancuso
- Directed by: Sheldon Wilson
- Starring: Felicia Day; Kavan Smith; Steven McHattie; Greg Bryk; David Reale
- Country of origin: Canada
- Original language: English

Production
- Producers: Lewis Chesler; Angela Mancuso; Marci McCurlie; Robert Vaughan
- Running time: 87 minutes

Original release
- Network: Syfy
- Release: October 30, 2010

Red: Werewolf Hunter is a 2010 Canadian television horror film directed by Sheldon Wilson, loosely based on the story of Little Red Riding Hood. It is a Syfy television film, produced by Toronto-based Chesler/Perlmutter Productions. It premiered on Syfy on October 30, 2010, and released on DVD on January 3, 2012.

== Plot ==
Virginia (Felicia Day), modern-day descendant of Little Red Riding Hood, brings her fiancé, Nathan (Kavan Smith), home to meet her family. Virginia's grandmother (Rosemary Dunsmore) and brother Jake (David Reale) welcome Virginia back, with Jake calling her "Red", a family nickname of the first daughter in every generation. Shortly after their arrival, Nathan finds a man staggering up the driveway half dead. The dying man says the name "Gabriel" before Nathan runs for Virginia. When they return, the man is already ashes. The sheriff, who is Virginia's other brother Marcus (Greg Bryk), arrives and contains the situation, much to Nathan's dismay. Virginia takes Nathan inside and explains that they hunt werewolves. Nathan, not believing her, goes for a walk at sunset. He is attacked and bitten by a werewolf who reveals his name to be Gabriel (Stephen McHattie). The next day, while preparing for a hunt, Nathan asks if they had ever turned a werewolf back. Virginia tells him that the only way to break the curse is to kill the werewolf who turned the person, before the newly bitten werewolf kills a human. Shortly after, they go hunting in town where Nathan kills a werewolf. After the wolves are dead, they find a girl locked in their car's trunk. She tells them that the wolves are planning on a "game" that no human survives. Later that night, while setting up camp, Nathan transforms into a werewolf for the first time. Desperate to protect him, Virginia insists on locking him up for the night. Nathan awakens the next morning in a cell. With the curse over for the night, he is released for the day, to help hunt Gabriel. Back in town, Marcus and Jake are taken captive for the "game". When the night comes to an end, it is revealed that the brothers were killed.

The next day, the family prepare for a final battle, and Gabriel seizes the moment to kidnap Virginia. Nathan finds the brothers shortly before finding Virginia. The couple return home and finish preparations for the full moon. As the sun goes down, the battle begins. Nathan is locked in his cage with the grandmother watching him. Red kills several of the werewolves who enter the house, before confronting Gabriel. Meanwhile, the grandmother tries to shoot Nathan as he turns into a werewolf. Upon escaping from the cell, Nathan, in werewolf form, kills the grandmother. Upstairs, Virginia is pursued by Gabriel. After covering her blood stained hand in silver paint, she smears it on Gabriel, who falls over the rail, two stories. Virginia jumps after him, plunging a silver headed harpoon into his heart. As he dies, Virginia hears the howl of a werewolf. Fearing the worst, she flees to the basement to see Nathan, but finds her grandmother dead. Grabbing a red cloak, Virginia runs to the woods to find Nathan. Werewolf Nathan attacks Virginia, knocking her out. In the morning, Virginia discovers she's been bitten. Several feet from where she fell was a trail of blood leading to an old ruined building. Inside, Nathan is human again. He pledges his love to Virginia, saying he wants a life with her. As he hugs her, Virginia stabs him with a silver knife, swearing she'll always love him. With his death, the curse on Virginia is broken. The film ends with her reading the story of Little Red Riding Hood to her daughter as a wolf howls in the distance.

== Cast ==
- Felicia Day as Virginia "Red" Sullivan
- Kavan Smith as Nathan, Red's Fiancé
- Greg Bryk as Marcus Sullivan
- David Reale as Jake Sullivan
- Steven McHattie as Gabriel
- Rosemary Dunsmore as Grandmother Sullivan

== Home media ==
It was released on DVD by Sony Pictures Home Entertainment on January 3, 2012.
