= Barjo =

1992 film by Jérôme Boivin

- American VHS cover
- Confessions d'un Barjo
- Directed by: Jérôme Boivin
- Written by: Jacques Audiard; Jérôme Boivin
- Based on: Confessions of a Crap Artist by Philip K. Dick
- Produced by: Françoise Galfré (exec. prod.); Patrick Godeau
- Starring: Anne Brochet; Richard Bohringer; Hippolyte Girardot
- Cinematography: Jean-Claude Larrieu
- Edited by: Anne Lafarge
- Music by: Hugues Le Bars
- Distributed by: Pan-Européenne Distribution
- Release date: 13 May 1992 (France)
- Running time: 85 minutes
- Country: France
- Language: French

Barjo (French: Confessions d'un Barjo) is a 1992 French film adaptation of Philip K. Dick's non-science fiction novel Confessions of a Crap Artist, originally written in 1959 and published in 1975, the only non-science fiction novel of Dick's to be published in his lifetime. The film was directed by Jérôme Boivin and written by Jacques Audiard and Jérôme Boivin, and stars Anne Brochet, Richard Bohringer and Hippolyte Girardot. "Barjo" translates as "nutcase" or "nut job".

== Plot ==
Barjo (Hippolyte Girardot) is eccentric, naive and obsessive. After he accidentally burns down his house during a "scientific" experiment, he moves in with his impulsive twin sister Fanfan (Anne Brochet), who is married to Charles "the Aluminum King" (Richard Bohringer). In his new surroundings, Barjo continues his old habits: cataloging old science magazines, testing bizarre inventions and filling his notebooks with his observations about human behavior and his thoughts about the end of the world. Through Barjo's journals we see the development of conflict and sexual tension between Fanfan and Charles, and the descent of Charles into madness.

== Cast ==
- Richard Bohringer as Charles
- Anne Brochet as Fanfan
- Hippolyte Girardot as Barjo
- Consuelo De Haviland as Madame Hermelin
- Renaud Danner as Michel
- Nathalie Boutefeu as Gwen
- Jac Berrocal as Mage Gerardini
- Camille Gentet as Fanfan enfant
- Charles-Elie Rouart as Barjo enfant

== Production ==
Filming took place in the autumn of 1991, in Annecy, Faverges and Thorens-Glières (Haute-Savoie). The film was also partly shot in Île-de-France region and in the Oise department.

== See also ==
- List of adaptations of works by Philip K. Dick
