= Case 39 =

2009 supernatural horror film by Christian Alvart

- Theatrical film poster
- Directed by: Christian Alvart
- Written by: Ray Wright
- Produced by: Lisa Bruce; Steve Golin; Alix Madigan; Kevin Misher
- Starring: Renée Zellweger; Jodelle Ferland; Ian McShane; Bradley Cooper
- Cinematography: Hagen Bogdanski
- Edited by: Mark Goldblatt
- Music by: Michl Britsch
- Production companies: Misher Films; Anonymous Content
- Distributed by: Paramount Pictures
- Release dates: August 13, 2009 (New Zealand); November 5, 2009 (Australia); October 1, 2010 (United States)
- Running time: 109 minutes
- Countries: United States; Canada
- Language: English
- Budget: $26 million
- Box office: $28.2 million

Case 39 is a 2009 supernatural horror film directed by Christian Alvart and written by Ray Wright. It stars Renée Zellweger, Jodelle Ferland, Bradley Cooper, and Ian McShane. The film revolves around a social worker who attempts to protect a little girl from her violent parents but finds that things are more dangerous than she had expected.

Case 39 was previously released in New Zealand on August 13, 2009, and in Australia on November 5, before being theatrically released in the United States on October 1, 2010, by Paramount Pictures. The film was panned by critics, and underperformed at the box office, grossing $28.2 million against its budget of $26 million.

== Plot ==
Emily is a social worker assigned to investigate the family of 10-year-old Lillith Sullivan, as her grades have declined and an emotional rift with her parents has emerged. Emily suspects that the parents have been abusing and overprotecting Lillith since the day she was born, and proposes to her department to take the child away from her parents' custody. Eventually, Emily's suspicions are confirmed when Lillith's parents try to kill her by roasting her alive in their oven. Emily saves Lillith with the help of Detective Mike Barron.

Lillith is to be sent to a children's home, but she begs Emily to look after her instead. With the board's agreement, Emily is assigned to care for Lillith until a suitable foster family is found. In the meantime, Lillith's parents are placed in a mental institution since they are no longer fit for their parental responsibility for the girl, according to the court.

After Lillith moves in, strange things begin to happen around Emily. Another of Emily's cases, a boy named Diego, murders his parents, and Barron informs Emily that somebody phoned Diego from her house the night before the crime. As she is suspected of involvement in the incident, Lillith undergoes a psychiatric evaluation by Emily's best friend, Dr. Douglas J. Ames. During the session, Lillith turns the evaluation around, asking Douglas what his fears are and subtly threatening him. That night, after receiving a "strange phone call" at his apartment, Douglas is panicked by the sight of a mass of hornets coming out of his body. His panic causes him to fall and break his neck on the toilet, killing him instantly.

Emily becomes suspicious about having Lillith in her home, so she heads to the mental asylum to seek answers from Lillith's parents. They tell her that Lillith is a demon who feeds on feelings, and that they tried to kill her in an attempt to save themselves and others. Lillith's father tells Emily that the only way to kill Lillith is to get her to sleep. Shortly after Emily leaves the asylum, both parents die: her mother is fatally burned, and her father is stabbed in the eye with a fork.

Barron thinks Emily should seek psychiatric help, but is later convinced when he receives a similar strange phone call in his home from Emily's cellphone, which is being used by Lillith. He arms himself at the police precinct to aid Emily in handling Lillith; however, he inadvertently and fatally shoots himself in the head with a shotgun when Lillith makes him imagine he is being attacked by permanently ferocious dogs.

After realizing that her closest colleagues have been eliminated, and that the rest of her cases will be next, that night, Emily has Lillith drink tea spiked with sedative, and while Lillith is asleep, Emily sets fire to her house, hoping and attempting to get rid of her. However, the girl escapes unharmed.

The police offer to escort Emily and Lillith to a temporary place to stay. As Emily follows the police cars, she suddenly takes a different route and drives at high speed, hoping to instill fear in Lillith. She then drives the car off a pier.

As the car sinks, Emily struggles to lock Lillith (now in her true demon form) in the trunk. Emily then exits the car, but as she swims away, the surviving Lillith grabs her leg after punching a hole through the car's taillight, in an attempt to prevent her escape. Emily struggles to break free until Emily overcomes her strengths and fears, which causes Lillith to finally let go of Emily as the car continues to sink, finally defeating Lillith from the inside. As Emily climbs back ashore, she is relieved to be rid of Lillith, hence bringing the case itself to a close.

== Cast ==
- Renée Zellweger as Emily Jenkins
- Jodelle Ferland as Lillith "Lily" Sullivan
- Ian McShane as Detective Mike Barron
- Bradley Cooper as Dr. Douglas J. Ames
- Callum Keith Rennie as Edward Sullivan
- Kerry O'Malley as Margaret Sullivan
- Adrian Lester as Wayne
- Cynthia Stevenson as Nancy
- Alexander Conti as Diego
- Benita Ha as Therapist
- Alisen Down as Emily's Mother
- Colin Lawrence as Police Sergeant
- Bill Mondy as Interviewer
- Andrew Airlie as Doctor
- Georgia Craig as Denise (uncredited)

== Production ==
The film was shot in Vancouver in late 2006. On October 31, 2006, a fire started on the film's set in Vancouver. None of the cast were on the set at the time and nobody was seriously injured, though the set and studio were destroyed. The film was released theatrically in the UK, other European countries, and Latin America on August 13, 2009. The film was initially scheduled for American release in August 2008, but was delayed twice in U.S. before its final release date in the United States on October 1, 2010.

== Reception ==
=== Critical response ===
Case 39 was panned by critics. On the review aggregator website Rotten Tomatoes, 22% of 74 critics' reviews are positive, with an average rating of 4.0/10. The website's consensus reads: "Director Christian Alvert has a certain stylish flair, but it's wasted on Case 39's frightless, unoriginal plot." Metacritic, which uses a weighted average, assigned the film a score of 25 out of 100, based on 15 critics, indicating "generally unfavorable" reviews.

Gareth Jones of Dread Central gave the film two out of five, saying: "I'm sure it will do decent business among the undemanding weekend-horror crowd and Zellweger fans when it eventually sees the light of day. Nobody else need apply." Margaret Pomeranz of At the Movies Australia gave the film one out of five stars, calling it "one of the least scary, dumbest movies I've seen in a long time", while co-host David Stratton gave it 1½ out of 5, commenting that "once it sort of kicks into the plot – once it really gets down to the nitty gritty, like so many horror films it just becomes really ridiculous and silly."

Conversely, Peter Bradshaw at The Guardian scored Case 39 four out of five, saying "shlocky and ridiculous it may be, but this horror-thriller really is gleefully gruesome and undeniably entertaining... for sheer, sustained nastiness, this could hardly be beaten, channelling the spirit of Damien: Omen II and the Japanese Ring movies.

=== Box office ===
Case 39 grossed $13.3 million in the United States and Canada, and $14.9 million in other territories, for a worldwide total of $28.2 million, against a budget of $26 million.
