= Jodelle Ferland =

Canadian actress (born 1994)

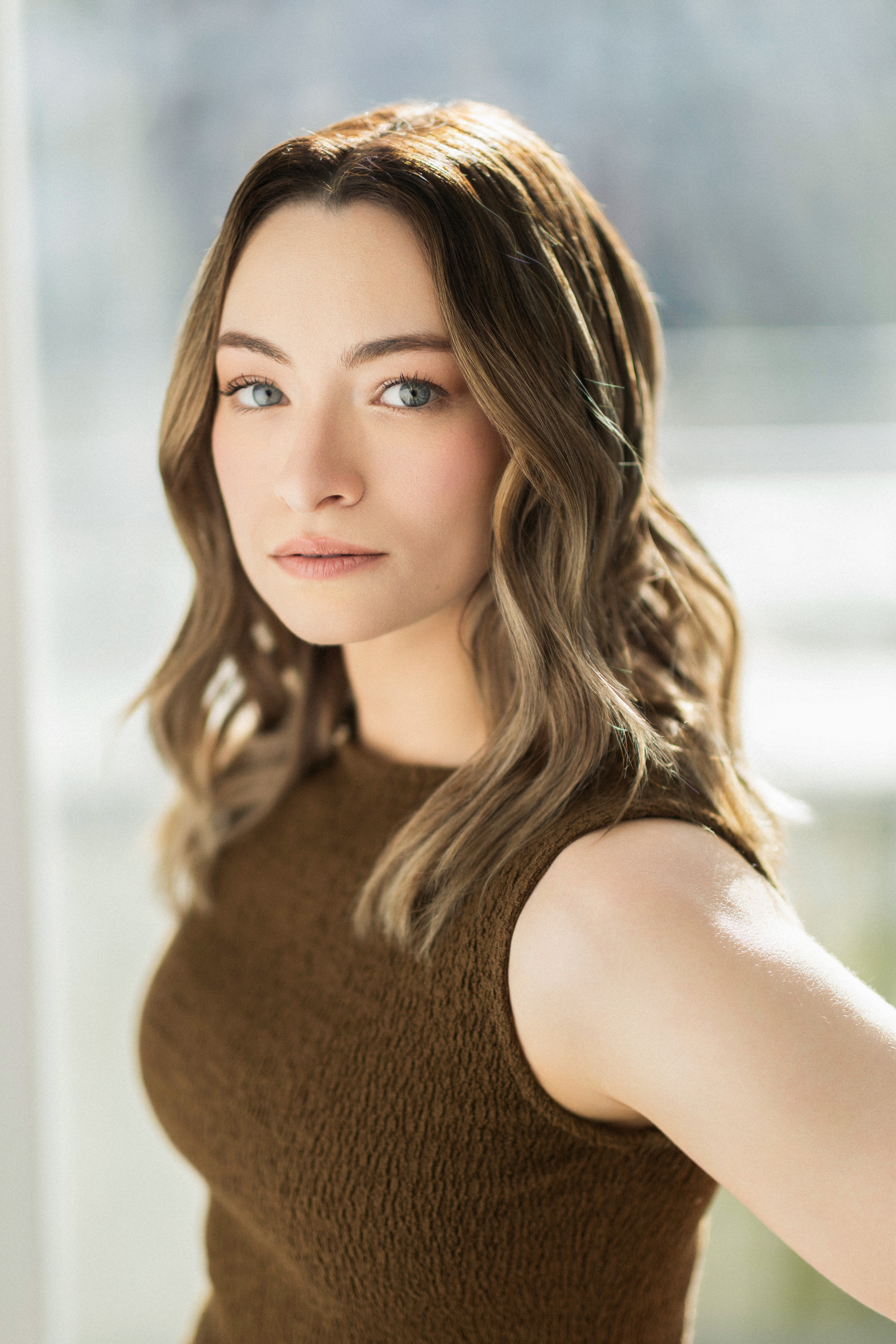
- Ferland in 2026
- Born: Jodelle Micah Ferland; October 9, 1994 (age 32); Nanaimo, British Columbia, Canada
- Occupation: Actress
- Years active: 1996–present

Jodelle Micah Ferland (born October 9, 1994) is a Canadian actress. She performed in the drama film Mermaid (2000) at the age of four, for which she received a Daytime Emmy nomination at the age of six, making her one of the youngest Emmy nominees. She then portrayed a young Carrie White in the horror film Carrie (2002) and starred in the television series Kingdom Hospital (2004).

Ferland was critically praised for leading the fantasy film Tideland (2005), and gained wide recognition for portraying Alessa Gillespie in the Silent Hill film adaptation (2006). She then starred in the horror films The Messengers (2007), Case 39 (2009), and The Cabin in the Woods (2011), and the comedy film Good Luck Chuck (2007). She achieved her highest-grossing film with the romantic fantasy The Twilight Saga: Eclipse (2010), in which she portrayed Bree Tanner.

Ferland had voice roles in the video game BioShock 2 (2010) and the stop motion film ParaNorman (2012), and led the science fiction series Dark Matter (2015–2017). Her acting activity decreased in the late 2010s.

== Early life ==
Jodelle Micah Ferland was born in Nanaimo, British Columbia. She is of French, British and Austrian ancestry.

== Career ==
=== 1990s & 2000s ===
Ferland started her career in commercials at the age of two in 1996. She made her acting debut in the television film Mermaid, filmed when she was four and released when she was five. For her performance, she received a Daytime Emmy Award nomination at the age of six, making her one of the youngest nominees of the award. She also won a Young Artist Award. She made guest appearances in several television series, including Stargate Atlantis, Dark Angel, Stargate SG-1, Smallville and Supernatural, and appeared in films including They and Trapped.

In 2005, she starred in the Terry Gilliam fantasy film Tideland, for which she received a Genie Award nomination in the Best Actress category. Later, she appeared in the 2006 film Silent Hill, an adaptation of the well-known video game, and had a supporting role in Good Luck Chuck for Lions Gate Entertainment. In 2006, she was cast opposite Renée Zellweger in the horror movie Case 39 as Lillith Sullivan, which was released in 2009; production was delayed after a fire destroyed the film set in October 2006.

=== 2010s ===
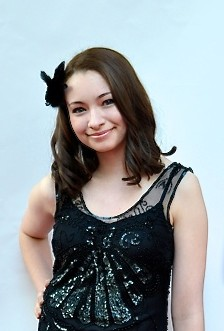
Ferland in 2011

In 2010, Ferland played Bree Tanner in the romantic fantasy film Eclipse, the third film of the Twilight series. "Usually I read the script before I take a role, but I haven't read this one," she explained. "It's Twilight; of course, I'm going to take it." From 2010 to 2011, she provided voice work for the videogame BioShock 2 and its downloadable content, appeared in the SyFy movie Ice Quake, and starred in the Lifetime television movie Girl Fight.

In 2012, Ferland appeared in the drama Mighty Fine, the horror film The Tall Man, Joss Whedon's The Cabin in the Woods, and the comedy film Home Alone: The Holiday Heist. For The Cabin in the Woods, filming took place in 2009. She also had a voice role in the stop-motion animated film ParaNorman, which earned an Academy Award nomination.

From 2013 to 2014, she starred in the family film Midnight Stallion, the short film Monster, and the crime drama film A Warden's Ransom. In 2015, she starred in the short film The Goodbye Girl and the horror film The Unspoken, which premiered at the Film4 Frightfest Film Festival on October 24. In 2016 she appeared in the Lifetime television movie My Daughter's Disgrace, and provided the narration for the audio book Wonder Women, written by Sam Maggs.

From 2015 to 2017, Ferland starred as Five in the SyFy series Dark Matter, based on the comic book series of the same name. On the role, she stated "On my latest show Dark Matter people teased me because I was the youngest in the cast but I had been acting the longest." She received a nomination for the Saturn Award for Best Performance by a Younger Actor in a Television Series in 2016. In 2017, she appeared in the comedy Bigger Fatter Liar, the sequel to the 2002 movie and the horror film Neverknock.

In 2018, she appeared in an episode of Frankie Drake Mysteries. The same year, Ferland starred as Olive in the digital series Darken: Before the Dark, a prequel to the film Darken.

=== 2020s ===
Ferland is set to appear in the short film Women Seen directed by Amanda Tapping. In 2019, she was cast in the film Office Games as Tina, which was later released in 2022.

== Filmography ==
=== Film ===
Year	Title	Role	Notes
2000	The Linda McCartney Story	Heather (age 5–6)	as Jodelle Micah Ferland
2001	Deadly Little Secrets	Madison	
2002	They	Sarah	as Jodelle Micah Ferland
2005	Tideland	Jeliza-Rose / various voiced characters	
2006	Silent Hill	Sharon Da Silva / Alessa Gillespie	
2006	Amber's Story	Nichole Taylor Timmons	as Jodelle Micah Ferland
2007	The Messengers	Michael Rollins	
2007	Seed	Emily Bishop	
2007	Good Luck Chuck	Lila Carpenter	as Jodelle Micah Ferland
2007	BloodRayne 2: Deliverance	Sally	
2008	Wonderful World	Sandra	
2009	Case 39	Lillith Sullivan	
2010	The Twilight Saga: Eclipse	Bree Tanner	
2012	Mighty Fine	Natalie Fine	
2012	The Tall Man	Jenny	
2012	The Cabin in the Woods	Patience Buckner	
2012	ParaNorman	Aggie	Voice role
2013	Midnight Stallion	Megan Shepard	Also known as Midnight Rider
2014	A Warden's Ransom	Kit Brandt	Also known as Steel & Stilettos
2015	The Unspoken	Angela	
2017	Bigger Fatter Liar	Becca	Direct-to-video
2019	The Office Games	Tina	

=== Television ===
Year	Title	Role	Notes
1999	Cold Squad	Hailey Hatcher	Episodes: "First Deadly Sin", "Deadly Games: Part 2"
2000	Higher Ground	Young Juliette	Episode: "Innocence"
2000	Mermaid	Desiree Leanne 'Desi' Gill	Television film
2000	Special Delivery	Samantha Beck	Television film
2000	Sole Survivor	Nina Carpenter	Television miniseries
2001	Wolf Lake	Lily Kelly	Episode: unaired pilot
2001	Dark Angel	Annabelle Anselmo	Episode: "Red"
2001	The Lone Gunmen	Mary the Little Girl	Episode: "Cap'n Toby"
2001	So Weird	Maria	Episode: "Annie's Song"
2001	The Miracle of the Cards	Annie	Television film
2001	Trapped	Heather	Television film
2002	Special Unit 2	Focus Group Girl	Episode: "The Piper"
2002	John Doe	Jenny Nichols	Episode: Pilot
2002	Carrie	Little Carrie	Television film
2003	Smallville	Emily Eve Dinsmore	Episode: "Accelerate"
2003	Dead Like Me	Kirsti	Episode: Pilot
2003	Mob Princess	Young Patti	Television film
2004	Kingdom Hospital	Mary Jensen	Main role
2004	The Collector	The Devil / Little Girl	Episodes: "The Prosecutor", "The Rapper"
2004	10.5	Little 'Wow!' Girl	Miniseries
2004	Too Cool for Christmas	Alexa	Television film
2006	Supernatural	Melanie Merchant	Episodes: "Provenance"
2006	Stargate SG-1	Adria (age 7)	Episode: "Flesh and Blood"
2006	Masters of Horror	Lisa	Episode: "The V Word"
2006	The Secret of Hidden Lake	Young Maggie Dolan	Television movie
2007	Stargate Atlantis	Harmony	Episode: "Harmony"
2007	Pictures of Hollis Woods	Hollis Woods	Television film
2008	Céline	Young Céline	Television film
2010	Ice Quake	Tia Webster	Television film
2011	Girl Fight	Haley Macklin	Television film
2011–2012	The Haunting Hour: The Series	Alice / Sara	Episodes: "My Sister the Witch", "The Most Evil Sorcerer – Parts 1 & 2"
2012	Home Alone: The Holiday Heist	Alexis Baxter	Television film
2015	Motive	Sophie Glass	Episode: "The Glass House"
2015–2017	Dark Matter	Five / Das / Emily Kolburn	Main role
2016	My Daughter's Disgrace	Audrey	Television film; also known as Revenge Porn
2017	Neverknock	Leah	Television film
2018	Frankie Drake Mysteries	Ana	Episode: "Anastasia"
2018	Darken: Before the Dark	Olive	Web series; main role
2019	Supernatural	Emily	Episode: "Golden Time"
2020	The Order	Zecchia	Episode: "Fear Itself Parts 1 & 2"
2022	Aurora Teagarden Mysteries: Haunted by Murder	Tamara Dilger	Television film
2025	Murder in a Small Town	Vanessa	Recurring role

=== Video games ===
Year	Title	Role	Notes
2010	BioShock 2	Little Sisters	Voice role
2010	BioShock 2: The Protector Trials	Little Sisters	Voice role
2010	BioShock 2: Minerva's Den	Little Sisters	Voice role

=== Audiobooks ===
- Wonder Women (2016) by Sam Maggs, as Narrator

== Awards and nominations ==
Year	Award	Category	Nominated work	Result	Ref.
2001	Young Artist Award	Best Performance in a TV Movie (Comedy or Drama) – Young Actress Age Ten or Younger	Mermaid	Won	
2001	Daytime Emmy Award	Outstanding Performer in Children's Programming	Mermaid	Nominated	
2004	Young Artist Award	Best Performance in a TV Series – Guest Starring Young Actress	Smallville	Nominated	
2004	Leo Award	Dramatic Series: Best Guest Performance by a Female	The Collector	Nominated	
2005	Young Artist Award	Best Performance in a TV Series (Comedy or Drama) – Young Actress Age Ten or Younger	Kingdom Hospital	Nominated	
2007	Genie Award	Best Performance by an Actress in a Leading Role	Tideland	Nominated	
2007	Saturn Award	Best Performance by a Younger Actor	Tideland	Nominated	
2008	Young Artist Award	Best Performance in a TV Movie, Miniseries, or Special – Leading Young Actress	Pictures of Hollis Woods	Nominated	
2008	CAMIE Award	Lead Performance in a TV Movie, Series, or Special	Pictures of Hollis Woods	Won	
2009	Young Artist Award	Best Performance in a TV Movie, Miniseries or Special – Supporting Young Actress	Céline	Nominated	
2010	Leo Award	Best Performance by a Female in a Short Drama	Everything's Coming Up Rosie	Nominated	
2011	Fangoria Chainsaw Award	Best Supporting Actress	Case 39	Nominated	
2016	Saturn Award	Best Performance by a Younger Actor in a Television Series	Dark Matter	Nominated	
