= The Unspoken (film) =

2015 film directed by Sheldon Wilson

- Promotional release poster
- Directed by: Sheldon Wilson
- Written by: Sheldon Wilson
- Produced by: Jamie Goehring
- Starring: Jodelle Ferland; Neal McDonough; Pascale Hutton; Sunny Suljic; Michael Rogers
- Cinematography: Eric J. Goldstein
- Edited by: Tony Dean Smith
- Music by: Matthew Rogers
- Production companies: Lighthouse Pictures; Sapphire Fire Limited
- Distributed by: Paladin
- Release dates: October 24, 2015 (FrightFest); October 28, 2016 (United States)
- Running time: 91 minutes
- Country: Canada
- Language: English

The Unspoken (also known as The Haunting of Briar House) is a 2015 Canadian horror thriller film written and directed by Sheldon Wilson. It stars Jodelle Ferland, Neal McDonough, Pascale Hutton, Sunny Suljic, and Michael Rogers.

The Unspoken premiered at the Film4 FrightFest on October 24, 2015, and was released theatrically in the United States on October 28, 2016. The film received generally negative reviews.

== Cast ==
- Jodelle Ferland as Angela
- Sunny Suljic as Adrian
- Pascale Hutton as Jeanie
- Anthony Konechny as Luther
- Jonathan Whitesell as Logan
- Jake Croker as Rodney
- Chanelle Peloso as Pandy
- Rukiya Bernard as Portia
- Lochlyn Munro as Dad
- Michael Rogers as Elon
- Neal McDonough as Officer Bower

== Release ==
The Unspoken had its world premiere at the Film4 FrightFest film festival at the Prince Charles Cinema in London, England, on October 24, 2015. The film received a theatrical release in the United States on October 28, 2016.

== Reception ==
On Rotten Tomatoes, the film has an approval rating of 9% based on 11 reviews, with an average rating of 3.7/10.

Variety's Owen Gleiberman described The Unspoken as a blending of "standard glossy horror tropes executed with scary ineptitude." Neil Genzlinger of The New York Times similarly characterized the film as derivative, writing, "some of the frights work reasonably well; and Ms. Ferland is convincing. But there aren't enough surprises or innovations to make this one stand out in the sea of horror fare that comes along this time of year." Nick Allen of RogerEbert.com gave the film a score of one out of four stars, writing: "The Unspoken makes apparent that it is possible to have an eye for a genre, but no vision."

Justin Lowe of The Hollywood Reporter described the film as being hampered by an "uneven script, which vacillates between horror and thriller, although it's not particularly exemplary of either genre", and wrote that the film "[falls] back on jump scares, assaultive music cues and poltergeist-driven SFX". The Los Angeles Times' Noel Murray wrote that the film "has so much plot that it really shouldn't need to rely as much as it does on big, loud sounds", concluding, "This movie's about as scary as a jackhammer."
