= Screamers: The Hunting =

- DVD cover
- Directed by: Sheldon Wilson
- Screenplay by: Miguel Tejada-Flores
- Story by: Miguel Tejada-Flores; Tom Berry
- Based on: "Second Variety" by Philip K. Dick
- Produced by: Paul Pope; Stefan Wodoslawsky
- Starring: Gina Holden; Greg Bryk; Jana Pallaske; Tim Rozon; Stephen Amell; Lance Henriksen
- Cinematography: John P. Tarver
- Edited by: Isabelle Levesque
- Music by: Benoit Grey
- Production companies: Reel One Entertainment; Fries Film Company
- Distributed by: Sony Pictures Home Entertainment
- Release date: February 17, 2009
- Running time: 91 minutes
- Country: United States
- Language: English

Screamers: The Hunting is a 2009 American science fiction horror film directed by Sheldon Wilson and starring Gina Holden, Jana Pallaske, Greg Bryk, Stephen Amell and Lance Henriksen. The film is a sequel to the 1995 film Screamers and was released on DVD on February 17, 2009.

== Plot ==
On planet Sirius 6-B, three people approach a defunct communication bunker to turn on its distress beacon. Only one survives and triggers the beacon, while Screamers kill the rest.

Two months later, a rescue team arrives at Sirius 6B on the Alliance Command spacecraft Medusa. Since Joseph Hendrickson's death, (Note: As depicted in the first film.) there has been no communication from Sirius 6B until the distress signal. It is presumed that the Screamers have all ran out of battery.

An upcoming planet-wide solar meteor strike constrains the team's mission time to six days. While pilot Olof Soderquist remains behind to monitor the ship's status, the rest move out.

DAY 1

En route to the signal's location, the team discovers a dormant Screamer factory inside a hillside bunker. Screamers used parts of human victims as raw materials. The team spends the night in the bunker. Commander Sexton downloads the screamer schematics by charging one of them and unknowingly reactivates the factory.

DAY 2

A Screamer sneaks onboard Medusa and kills Soderquist. En route to a life-form reading within an old Berynium mine, the team is ambushed by unseen figures, as well as Screamers. Romulo, too injured to move, urges the others to escape before using a grenade to kill the screamers. Sexton orders an immediate retreat to Medusa.

DAY 3

Aboard Medusa, the survivors discover that a Screamer drained the fuel cells, making return impossible.

DAY 4

Lt. Bronte, Hendrickson's daughter, saves a local named Hannah, who leads them to the other survivors in the mine. There were once 400 survivors there, but the Screamers killed off most of them. The survivors have tunnel explosives to be detonated if the Screamers gain entry to the mine. The latest variety of Screamers can impersonate human. Bronte offers a safe return to Earth to the survivors if they help find fuel cells.

Bronte eventually discovers three teenagers bound to metal racks who plead for release. She notices blood and viscera on a dissection table nearby.

Bronte and her team release the prisoners, who turn out to be Screamer cyborgs. They destroy one but specialist Rafe Danielli is killed by another. The two remaining Screamers escape and kill a guard. The cyborgs later ambush the group and kill some survivors before Sexton and Bronte destroy them. They hear Screamers entering the mine and start to evacuate, detonating the explosives in their wake.

DAY 5

Sexton finds another abandoned mine where they spend the night.

DAY 6

The group enters a power relay station Guy knows. There, Hannah eventually puts a knife to Guy's throat, thinking that he is a Screamer. Sexton then kills her. The group proceeds down the corridor while medical officer Schwartz remains momentarily to cover Hannah's corpse. A Screamer kills Schwartz. Later, more Screamers advance towards the team. A masked stranger appears ahead of them and insists that they follow him to safety. As they run past, he fires an electromagnetic weapon at the pursuing screamers which deactivates them.

Safe inside his laboratory, the stranger introduces himself as Eugene Orsow. According to Orsow, there are not any fuel cells, and Screamers will converge on their position in some hours. The perimeter defense might hold them off.

Sexton eventually discovers Orsow installing fuel cells to the power grid. Orsow admits that he does not want the group to leave Sirius 6B to prevent screamer technology from reaching Earth. Sexton wounds him with the electromagnetic weapon, removes Orsow's TAB, and begins to pull out the cells. As the perimeter defenses deactivate, Orsow attacks Sexton but is killed. Sexton leaves with the cells to join the others.

Danielli, thought to be dead, breaches the compound, and an automated self-destruct sequence begins a 3-minute countdown. Danielli reveals that he has been transformed into a screamer-human hybrid, kills Madden, and mortally wounds Sexton before being destroyed by Bronte. She and Guy escape the facility as it is self-destructing.

They return to Medusa and discover that Madden has already gained entry and been transformed into a hybrid from Danielli's attack. Madden tries to transform Bronte too before Guy destroys him using the electromagnetic cannon.

Bronte installs the fuel cells, enabling Medusa to take off as the meteor storm descends. The pair enter cryogenic sleep for the two-month return journey to Earth. They awaken when the ship arrives in orbit. Bronte notices that she is pregnant but farther along than she should be for the allotted time and realizes too late that Guy has secretly been a hybrid as he overpowers her. Inside Bronte's womb, the fetus raises a hand and protrudes a claw.

== Cast ==
- Gina Holden as Lieutenant Victoria Bronte
- Stephen Amell as Guy
- Jana Pallaske as Schwartz
- Tim Rozon as Madden
- Greg Bryk as Commander Andy Sexton
- Lance Henriksen as Orsow
- Christopher Redman as Rafe Danielli
- Jody Richardson as Soderquist
- Dave Lapommeray as Sergeant Romulo
- Holly Uloth as Hannah
- Darryl Hopkins as Dwight
- Stephen Lush as Bryce
- Lynley Hall as Jessie
- Shaun Johnston as Haggard Man
- Ruth Lawrence as Cave Woman

== Reception ==
Bulletproof Action said, "It wasn’t award-winning or anything but there were enough good things to outweigh the bad. If you get a chance, check it out."

== See also ==
- List of adaptations of works by Philip K. Dick
