= Scarecrow (2013 film) =

- DVD cover
- Genre: Horror
- Written by: Rick Suvalle
- Directed by: Sheldon Wilson
- Starring: Lacey Chabert; Robin Dunne; Nicole Muñoz
- Theme music composer: Matthew Rogers
- Country of origin: United States
- Original language: English

Production
- Producer: Jamie Goehring
- Cinematography: Eric J. Goldstein
- Editor: Tony Dean Smith
- Running time: 86 minutes
- Production companies: Brightlight Pictures; Lighthouse Pictures; RHI Entertainment
- Budget: $2,000,000 (estimated)

Original release
- Network: Syfy
- Release: October 19, 2013

Scarecrow is a 2013 television horror film and the twenty-sixth film in the Maneater film series directed by Sheldon Wilson and starring Lacey Chabert, Robin Dunne, and Nicole Muñoz. A Syfy original film, it premiered on Syfy on October 19, 2013, and was released on DVD on February 25, 2014.

== Plot ==
Two teens, Chad and his girlfriend Marcy, go to a cornfield to scare their friends Tyler and Nikki for posting pictures of them online. They enter an old barn where they fall through the floor. Marcy injures her thigh and Chad tries to help her. Mysteriously, her blood soaks up below her and something moving startles her. A monstrous hand grabs Chad's head from behind, killing him as a terrified Marcy screams.

High school teacher Aaron Harris later takes six students: Calvin, Daevon, Nikki, Tyler, Maria and Beth to an abandoned cornfield to collect the scarecrow for the 100th Scarecrow festival. Nikki and Tyler tell the rest that the place has a legend that resulted from the deaths of 30 people who used to live there. Tyler starts the local chant, "It never sleeps, it never dies, it can't be stopped, hear their cries. The Scarecrow lives to kill us all. Keep it buried in the fall..." When they arrive, Aaron sees his ex-girlfriend Kristen Miller and gets out of the bus to talk to her. As they talk, Nikki takes the keys left in the ignition lock of the bus and retrieves her mobile phone that Aaron took away earlier.

Meanwhile, Kristen tells Aaron that she invited Eddie, Aaron's former best friend who previously dated Kristen, to help with the scarecrow. Eddie arrives and tries to leave after seeing Aaron, but can't restart his truck. In the meantime, the students head to the scarecrow. As Aaron, Kristen, and Eddie meet up with them, Calvin is tied to the scarecrow by Nikki and Tyler who are now missing. Kristen, Eddie and Daevon begin to untie Calvin when Beth is grabbed by an unknown force and dragged into the cornfield. Aaron tells Maria, Calvin and Daevon to stay where they are as he, Kristen, and Eddie goes to save Beth.

After they leave, Calvin runs off in a panic. Kristen finds Beth, who is still alive, but is dragged away herself. After she is helped, everyone runs to a deserted farmhouse next to the field. Something tries to bash through the door and they try to hold it off. Suddenly Nikki's body is thrown over the windowsill with her throat slashed, before being dragged back out again.

The remaining survivors barricade the farmhouse and Daevon finds a rifle which he gives to Eddie. Maria explains that Nikki took the bus keys so the only means of escape is Eddie's truck. Aaron decides he will make a break for the truck and drive to get help, but before he can, Calvin steals the keys and makes a break for the truck. As he tries to escape the scarecrow attacks him and kills him. Kristen attacks it with a Molotov cocktail which hits the truck and causes an explosion.

The group flees to the barn when the scarecrow blocks entry back to the farmhouse and quickly fall through the floor, where they find Marcy's remains and then Tyler's corpse hanging from the roof. They formulate a plan of escape and the group climbs a rope one by one as they hear a police siren approach them.

The cop is quickly killed after shooting the scarecrow, and the others retrieve his keys and plan to escape when they are again attacked and Daevon is killed.

Kristen, Aaron, Eddie, Beth and Maria escape and attempt to drive back to town when the scarecrow once again attacks and forces the car off the road and it hits a tree. Eddie is mortally wounded and sacrifices himself so the others can escape by igniting the gas leaking from the car. The group is then split up and Maria goes to meet up with Kristen and Aaron while Beth selfishly runs to a close by farm.

The group catches up and Maria berates Beth for being a coward. The remaining survivors break into the farmhouse and are confronted by a farmer. They explain what has happened and he confirms that the scarecrow was buried to stop it from killing Kristen's family to avenge a vendetta. Suddenly dogs begin to bark and the farmer tells the group being around Kristen is dangerous. He is quickly killed after leaving the group. Beth wants to give the scarecrow what it wants, but Aaron and Maria refuse and Beth once again flees.

Aaron, Kristen and Maria decide to escape on a tractor when they hear Beth in the distance begging for help. Kristen goes to help despite Maria begging her not to. When Kristen finds Beth, Beth holds a blade to Kristen's throat and calls out to the scarecrow to come get her. As it approaches Aaron throws a rope around it and puts the rope into machinery which drags the scarecrow into a shredder. It grabs Beth's leg and pulls her to her death.

The scarecrow emerges from the machinery and attacks Maria, cutting open her leg, but all three escape to the woods. Kristen forces Aaron and Maria to separate from her, knowing the scarecrow will follow her, and she retreats to the farm where she slices open her hand and wipes her blood on cattle and opens their gate to distract the scarecrow. It works and cows can be heard crying in pain as she returns to Aaron and Maria (who is now weak from blood loss and being carried by Aaron). Just as the group reunites the scarecrow spears Maria through the back, killing her and injuring Aaron.

As day breaks Aaron and Kristen head toward a boat graveyard to find a life boat to escape in, believing the scarecrow will not follow. They find a workman with his face ripped off and are quickly confronted by the scarecrow, which Aaron tackles and knocks into the water. Kristen runs below to try and help Aaron and finds him alive. He struggles to talk but tells Kristen to run just as the scarecrow punches through his chest, finally killing him.

Kristen arms herself with an axe and lures the scarecrow to the bowels of the ship where she sets it on fire in the furnace, causing the boat to explode, finally killing the scarecrow once and for all.

== Cast ==
- Lacey Chabert as Kristen Miller
- Robin Dunne as Aaron Harris
- Nicole Muñoz as Maria
- Brittney Wilson as Beth
- Carlo Marks as Eddie
- Reilly Dolman as Daevon
- Iain Belcher as Calvin
- Richard Harmon as Tyler
- Julia Maxwell as Nikki
- Kevin O'Grady as Officer Morris
- Jerry Wasserman as Frank Murphy
- Lanie McAuley as Marcy
- Keenan Tracey as Chad

== Release ==
The film was released on DVD by Gaiam International on February 25, 2014. It was later released by Sonar Entertainment on March 10, 2015 as a part of its 2-disk Fright Night Collection.
