= Mermaid (2000 film) =

2000 television movie

Mermaid, released in 2000, is a television movie based on the real-life story of Desiree Leanne Gill as she learns to accept her father's death. It aired originally on Showtime, and it was released on DVD in 2001. Jodelle Ferland and Ellen Burstyn were both nominated for a Daytime Emmy for Outstanding Performer in a Children's Special.

== Cast ==
- Ellen Burstyn - Trish
- Samantha Mathis - Rhonda
- Jodelle Ferland - Desiree Leann ("Desi") Gill
- David Kaye - Wade
- Peter Flemming - Steve
- Tom Keaton - Quaid
- Blu Mankuma - Caretaker
- Joshua Peace - Ken
- Chilton Crane - Donna
- Julia Higgs - Amanda
- Mecca Menard - Hailey
