= Foster, You're Dead! =

1955 science fiction short story by Philip K. Dick

"Foster, You're Dead!" is a 1955 science fiction short story by American writer Philip K. Dick. It was first published in Star Science Fiction Stories No.3.

The story is a satire of two 1950s-era trends: consumerism and increasing Cold War anxiety. Dick wrote in a letter:

"One day I saw a newspaper headline reporting that the President suggested that if Americans had to buy their bomb shelters, rather than being provided with them by the government, they'd take better care of them, an idea which made me furious. Logically, each of us should own a submarine, a jet fighter, and so forth."

It was adapted by Kalen Egan and Travis Sentell for the episode "Safe and Sound" of the 2017 TV series Philip K. Dick's Electric Dreams.

== Plot summary ==
The story takes place in 1971 where the vast majority of citizens own private bomb shelters and financially support nuclear war preparations for their town. New models of "improved" shelters are released and bought every year (much like vacuum cleaners or automobiles) because the Soviets supposedly develop new methods of attack on previously-developed shelters.

The story revolves around Mike Foster, the adolescent son of an "anti-P", a movement of outsiders refusing to take part in these preparations, because they argue the military industrial complex is only creating fear to sell more bomb shelters. Mike, however, lives in fear that he will not have access to a shelter when the war begins and is a social outcast because of his father's political positions.

Finally, Foster's father gives up his resistance and buys a brand-new costly bomb shelter model. Foster luckily boards the new shelter. Soon afterward, news reports the Soviets developed a new anti-shelter technique leaving all recent models totally vulnerable, requiring a new "adapter" to make current models safe again.

Then, Mike's Father is forced to sell the shelter back due to economic issues. Foster then runs and hides in the shelter, where he is pulled out kicking and screaming by the marketers, and the story ends with a satirical note, a sign saying: "PEACE ON EARTH, GOOD WILL TO MEN, PUBLIC SHELTER, ADMISSION 50¢"
