= Electric Dreams (2017 TV series) =

Science fiction anthology television series

- Genre: Science fiction; Thriller; Anthology; Dystopian
- Based on: Short stories by Philip K. Dick
- Developed by: Ronald D. Moore; Michael Dinner
- Theme music composer: Harry Gregson-Williams
- Composers: Harry Gregson-Williams; Ólafur Arnalds; Cristobal Tapia de Veer; BT; Mark Isham; Bear McCreary
- Countries of origin: United Kingdom; United States
- Original language: English
- No. of seasons: 1
- No. of episodes: 10

Production
- Executive producers: Ronald D. Moore; Michael Dinner; Bryan Cranston; James Degus; Isa Dick Hackett; Kalen Egan; Christopher Tricario; Maril Davis; David Kanter; Matt DeRoss; Lila Rawlings; Marigo Kehoe; Kate DiMento; Don Kurt
- Producers: Lynn Horsford; Rupert Ryle-Hodges; Dan Winch
- Running time: 50 minutes
- Production companies: Anonymous Content; Channel 4 Television; Amazon Studios; Electric Shepherd Productions; Moon Shot Entertainment; Left Bank Pictures; Rooney McP Productions; Tall Ship Productions; Sony Pictures Television

Original release
- Network: Channel 4 (United Kingdom); Amazon Prime Video (United States)
- Release: 17 September 2017 – 19 March 2018

Philip K. Dick's Electric Dreams, or simply Electric Dreams, is a science fiction television anthology series based on the works of 20th-century writer Philip K. Dick. Written by British and American writers, the series consists of ten standalone 50-minute episodes serving as adaptations of Dick's work—nine short stories and one novelette ("Autofac"). Electric Dreams premiered on Channel 4 in the United Kingdom on 17 September 2017, and in the United States on Amazon Prime Video on 12 January 2018.

== Production ==
=== Development ===
The series was initially planned to run on AMC and Channel 4, before AMC pulled out, leading Channel 4 to announce the series. In February 2017, it was announced that Amazon Video had bought the U.S. rights to the series.

The series is produced by Sony Pictures Television with Ronald D. Moore, Michael Dinner, and Bryan Cranston serving as executive producers. Cranston also stars in one of the episodes. The episode writers include Ronald D. Moore, Michael Dinner, Tony Grisoni, Jack Thorne, Matthew Graham, David Farr, Dee Rees, and Travis Beacham. Jack Thorne wrote the teleplay for "The Commuter", based on the short story of the same name, with Tom Harper directing the episode.

=== Casting ===
In March 2017, Timothy Spall joined the episode "The Commuter", starring opposite Anthony Boyle and Tuppence Middleton. The following month, Jack Reynor and Benedict Wong were cast to lead the episode "Impossible Planet", alongside a supporting cast including Geraldine Chaplin and Georgina Campbell. Also in April, Steve Buscemi was cast in "Crazy Diamond", and Greg Kinnear and Mireille Enos joined the episode "The Father Thing".

On 3 May 2017, Anna Paquin and Terrence Howard were cast in the episode "Real Life", with a supporting cast including Rachelle Lefevre, Jacob Vargas, Sam Witwer, Guy Burnet and Lara Pulver. Also in May, Richard Madden and Holliday Grainger were announced to star in "The Hood Maker". Later that month, Vera Farmiga and Mel Rodriguez were cast to lead the episode "Kill All Others", with Jason Mitchell, Glenn Morshower and Sarah Baker also appearing. Finally in May, Janelle Monáe and Juno Temple joined the cast of the episode "Autofac" alongside Jay Paulson and David Lyons.

In June 2017, Maura Tierney and Annalise Basso were cast to star in "Safe and Sound", and Bryan Cranston was confirmed to appear in the episode "Human Is" with Essie Davis, Liam Cunningham and Ruth Bradley.

=== Filming ===
Five episodes were filmed in England and five were filmed in Chicago.

The fourth episode of the series, "Crazy Diamond", filmed in two locations in Kent, England; the Dungeness estate was used for various exterior settings and driving scenes, and the Cheyne Court wind farm was used as the checkpoint Sally passes on her way in and out of the estate.

=== Music ===
Harry Gregson-Williams was hired to compose the main titles theme music and score an episode, and Ólafur Arnalds and Cristobal Tapia de Veer were also hired to score multiple episodes each. Brian Transeau and Mark Isham scored music for the episode titled "Autofac", while Bear McCreary scored music for three episodes in the first season.

=== Sequels ===
Amazon intended the production as a limited series. The Hollywood Reporter reported in 2019 that sources said Sony TV was attempting to find a new home for the drama.

== Episodes ==
Each episode is based on a short story by Dick. The episode sequences are different on Channel 4 and Amazon Video.

No.	Title	Directed by	Teleplay by	Based on	Original release date	UK viewers (millions)
1	"The Hood Maker"	Julian Jarrold	Matthew Graham	"The Hood Maker"	17 September 2017	1.49
An authoritarian regime restricts telepaths to ghettos and routinely discriminates against them. A telepath named Honor is recruited to work for the police and, with her handler Agent Ross, investigates a mysterious individual called the "Hood Maker", who distributes telepathy-proof hoods throughout the city. Amid new violence, the telepaths riot. The Hood Maker reveals that Ross is their secret weapon, an anti-telepath bigot immune to telepathy. Ross protests that he has fallen in love with Honor, but she is unable to psychically validate his love and the episode ends with her uncertain whether to trust him. Cast : Richard Madden as Agent Ross; Holliday Grainger as Honor; Noma Dumezweni as Senior Agent Okhile; Anneika Rose as Mary; Richard McCabe as Dr. Thaddeus Cutter; Paul Ritter as Franklyn; and Tony Way as Carmichael
2	"Impossible Planet"	David Farr	David Farr	"The Impossible Planet"	24 September 2017	1.35
Two bored space tourism guides, Norton and Andrews, are approached by a 342-year-old woman, Irma Louise Gordon, who offers them five years' salary each to take her on one last trip to Earth. They are not sure the planet even exists anymore, so they head for a similar planet. Irma's robot servant deduces (and maintains) the subterfuge. Irma insists on re-enacting a dream with Norton, who closely resembles her grandfather. They enter the planet's toxic atmosphere. The remaining pilot sees a readout, showing that their oxygen has run out, but Irma (now appearing as her grandmother did when younger) and Norton see themselves in a green, stream fed valley. They remove their spacesuits and swim naked in a lake. Cast : Jack Reynor as Brian Norton; Benedict Wong as Ed Andrews; Geraldine Chaplin as Irma Louise Gordon; Georgina Campbell as Barbara; and Malik Ibheis as RB29
3	"The Commuter"	Tom Harper	Jack Thorne	"The Commuter"	1 October 2017	1.50
Ed Jacobson is a railway worker at Woking station. His life takes a turn for the worse when his son, Sam, experiences psychotic episodes. A woman named Linda asks for a ticket to a non-existent destination called "Macon Heights". Intrigued, Jacobson follows a number of passengers who jump off the train and walk to an idyllic village where their traumas are wiped away. On his return home, he discovers his son never existed. He returns to Macon Heights to find Linda and demand she restore his original life. Cast : Timothy Spall as Ed Jacobson; Rebecca Manley as Mary Jacobson; Anthony Boyle as Sam Jacobson; Rudi Dharmalingam as Bob Paine; Tuppence Middleton as Linda; Anne Reid as Martine Jenkins; Ann Akin as Dr. Simpson; Hayley Squires as Waitress; and Tom Brooke as Tall Man in Light Coat
4	"Crazy Diamond"	Marc Munden	Tony Grisoni	"Sales Pitch"	8 October 2017	0.96
Ed Morris works at a company that produces synthetic humanoids called Jacks and Jills, and the QCs ("quantum consciousness") that give them intelligence and emotions. He is approached by a dying Jill, who wants him to help her steal ten QCs – one to extend her own lifespan, and the rest to sell. Ed abandons both Jill and his wife, Sally, to follow his dream of escaping his life on a boat. Jill and Sally hijack his boat and sail away together. Cast : Steve Buscemi as Ed Morris; Sidse Babett Knudsen as Jill; Julia Davis as Sally Morris; Lucian Msamati as The Director; Joanna Scanlan as Su; and Michael Socha as Noah
5	"Real Life"	Jeffrey Reiner	Ronald D. Moore	"Exhibit Piece"	15 October 2017	0.88
After a traumatic event that has left her with survivor's guilt, Sarah accepts her wife's offer to test a new form of virtual reality that fulfills the customer's desires. Sarah experiences life as a widower named George, who seeks vengeance for the murder of his wife. Sarah and George, in their respective lives, increasingly resort to using virtual reality to escape their pain, blurring the lines over which life is the real one. Ultimately, Sarah chooses to live as George, convinced that her real life is too good to be true, and her neural pathways break down. Cast : Anna Paquin as Sarah; Terrence Howard as George; Rachelle Lefevre as Katie; Lara Pulver as Paula; Sam Witwer as Chris; Guy Burnet as Collins; and Jacob Vargas as Mario
6	"Human Is"	Francesca Gregorini	Jessica Mecklenburg	"Human Is"	29 October 2017	0.85
Mission director Vera Herrick is trapped in a loveless marriage with military hero Colonel Silas Herrick. Silas returns to the planet of Rexor IV to obtain a substance needed to process Earth's toxic atmosphere but comes under attack from the local Rexorians. When their ship returns on autopilot, Silas has apparently survived, and Vera finds him uncharacteristically kind and considerate. The colonel is arrested by the State, who believe that Silas has been taken over by a Rexorian consciousness. Despite knowing he has been replaced, Vera saves Silas from being executed. Cast : Bryan Cranston as Silas Herrick; Essie Davis as Vera Herrick; Liam Cunningham as General Olin; Ruth Bradley as Yaro Peterson; William Gaminara as Dr. El Ganol; Khalid Abdalla as Interrogator; and Ronan Vibert as Chief Judge
7	"The Father Thing"	Michael Dinner	Michael Dinner	"The Father-thing"	26 February 2018	N/A
Eleven-year-old Charlie has a close relationship with his father, sharing a love of baseball. One night, while camping out, they see glowing orbs slowly falling from the sky. At home, Charlie sees an alien seemingly consume and replace his father. As others also become suspicious of their loved ones, Charlie and his best friend eventually find a field filled with body doubles grown by the aliens, which they destroy. Cast : Greg Kinnear as The Father; Mireille Enos as The Mother; Jack Gore as Charlie Cotrell; Shannon Brown as Rotko; Alana Arenas as Detective Fernandez; Terry Kinney as Mr. Dick; and Andrew Rothenberg as Captain Miller
8	"Autofac"	Peter Horton	Travis Beacham	"Autofac"	5 March 2018	N/A
Decades after a nuclear war, survivors in a small community struggle to make contact with an automated factory that has consumed most of their natural resources. Emily, a hacker, reprograms one of the factory's drones and files a nonsense customer service request. The factory dispatches an android, Alice, who refuses to stop making unwanted goods. Emily and two others force Alice to assist them in infiltrating the factory with bombs. After capturing them, Alice reveals that all humans died in the war, and the factory created androids to consume its goods. As Alice attempts to reprogram Emily, Emily unleashes a virus she hid in her own programming. Cast : Juno Temple as Emily; Janelle Monáe as Alice; David Lyons as Conrad Morrison; Nick Eversman as Avishai; Jay Paulson as Reverend Perine; and Maximiliano Hernández as Lewis
9	"Safe and Sound"	Alan Taylor	Kalen Egan and Travis Sentell	"Foster, You're Dead!"	12 March 2018	N/A
Irene Lee, a civil libertarian, enters the borders of a paranoid police state to negotiate for better accord with her people in the west, who are propagandized as terrorists. Her daughter, Foster, struggles to adjust to the much different society. Irene is aghast when Foster buys a high tech "Dex" PDA, due to the monitoring aspects that come with it, but Foster insists that its functions are necessary for her schoolwork. As Foster becomes isolated from both her mother and the other students, a friendly government agent named Ethan reaches out to her through the Dex and convinces Foster to assist in stopping a terrorist plot. By preying on Foster's mental illness and social isolation, they have her stage a fake terrorist attack, which the eastern government blames on her mother. The staged attack and Irene's alleged role in it are then used by the government as propaganda to justify further security measures. The episode concludes with a series of brief flashbacks showing Ethan's carefully planned manipulation of Foster. Cast : Annalise Basso as Foster Lee; Maura Tierney as Irene Lee; Connor Paolo as Ethan; Alice Lee as Milena; Algee Smith as Kaveh; and Martin Donovan as Odin
10	"Kill All Others"	Dee Rees	Dee Rees	"The Hanging Stranger"	19 March 2018	N/A
In the near future, video advertising is everywhere. North America is a single nation with a single presidential candidate. Philbert Noyce is unenthusiastic about consumerism and is a low-motivation Q.A. worker on a production line. During a speech, Philbert hears the candidate say "kill all others" while those words flash on the screen. Few others have seen or heard the message but many are affected by it. Those who believe him write it off as harmless rhetoric. After stopping a train to photograph a "Kill all others" message and after preventing a mob from assaulting a woman they claim is an "other", Philbert is ordered to see a mandated psychologist. Eventually, Philbert flees onto a billboard which proclaims "KILL ALL OTHERS" and which seems to have a body hanging from it. He is swarmed by police with the same psychologist. Philbert lambasts the government's callousness and declares that everyone is an "Other". Philbert confirms that the body is real, and, while grabbing on to the body, falls off the billboard. His co-workers, who had been watching the broadcast, merely switch to a different TV channel. Philbert himself is seen later, hanged from another "kill all others" billboard. Cast : Mel Rodriguez as Philbert Noyce; Sarah Baker as Maggie Noyce; Jason Mitchell as Lenny; Glenn Morshower as Ed; Louis Herthum as Supervisor; Gabriel Ruiz as TV Host; Tim Heurlin as TV Pundit; Karissa Murrell Myers as TV Pundit 2; DuShon Monique Brown as Peace Sergeant; and Vera Farmiga as the Candidate

== Reception ==
On review aggregation website Rotten Tomatoes, the series has an approval rating of 72% based on reviews from 53 critics, with an average rating of 6.06/10. The site's critical consensus reads, "Electric Dreams's dreamy production values and optimistic tone help make up for a lack of originality and tonal cohesion – and save the show from feeling like just another Black Mirror clone." Metacritic assigned the first season a weighted average score of 68 out of 100, based on 16 critics, indicating "generally favorable reviews".

=== Accolades ===
Year	Award	Category	Nominee	Result	Ref.
2018	44th Saturn Awards	Best Guest Performance in a Television Series	Bryan Cranston	Nominated	
2018	44th Saturn Awards	Best New Media Television Series	Electric Dreams	Nominated	
2018	2nd Black Reel Awards for Television	Outstanding Actor, TV Movie or Limited Series	Terrence Howard	Nominated	
2018	2nd Black Reel Awards for Television	Outstanding Actress, TV Movie or Limited Series	Janelle Monáe	Nominated	
2018	2nd Black Reel Awards for Television	Outstanding Director, TV Movie or Limited Series	Dee Rees (for the episode "Kill All Others")	Nominated	
2018	2nd Black Reel Awards for Television	Outstanding Writing, TV Movie or Limited Series	Dee Rees (for the episode "Kill All Others")	Nominated	
2018	70th Primetime Emmy Awards	Outstanding Music Composition for a Limited or Anthology Series, Movie or Special	Cristobal Tapia de Veer (for the episode "Crazy Diamond")	Nominated	
2018	70th Primetime Emmy Awards	Outstanding Music Composition for a Limited or Anthology Series, Movie or Special	Harry Gregson-Williams (for the episode "The Commuter")	Nominated	

== Broadcast ==
The series was greenlit for production by Channel 4 in the UK and Amazon Prime in the United States. The first six episodes were screened weekly on Channel 4 in 2017, with the rest premiering on 12 January 2018 on Amazon, when the entire season was released on Amazon Streaming worldwide (except UK, Canada and Australia). On Amazon, the episode order is sequenced differently from the UK broadcast. Electric Dreams was broadcast on Space in Canada and on the streaming service Stan in Australia.

== See also ==
- List of adaptations of works by Philip K. Dick
