= Sheldon Wilson =

Canadian film director

- Born: Sarnia, Ontario, Canada
- Occupations: Film director; screenwriter; film producer
- Years active: 2001–present

Sheldon Wilson is a Canadian film director, screenwriter, and film producer. He is known for directing Shallow Ground (2004) and The Unspoken (2015), and has also directed several Sci Fi Pictures original films, including Kaw (2006), Carny (2009), Mothman, Red: Werewolf Hunter (both 2010), and Scarecrow (2013).

== Selected filmography ==
=== Film ===
Year	Title	Director	Writer	Producer	Notes	Ref(s)
2001	Night Class	Yes				
2004	Shallow Ground	Yes	Yes	Yes		
2009	Screamers: The Hunting	Yes			Direct-to-video film	
2015	Shark Killer	Yes	Yes			
2015	The Unspoken	Yes	Yes			

=== Television ===
Year	Title	Director	Writer	Producer	Notes	Ref(s)
2006	Kaw	Yes			Television film	
2009	Carny	Yes			Television film	
2010	Mothman	Yes			Television film	
2010	Red: Werewolf Hunter	Yes			Television film	
2011	Mega Cyclone	Yes	Co-writer		Television film Co-wrote with David Ray also known as Super Storm	
2011	Killer Mountain	Yes	Yes		Television film	
2011	Snowmageddon	Yes			Television film	
2013	Cold Spring	Yes			Television film	
2013	Scarecrow	Yes			Television film	
2013	Grave Halloween		Co-writer		Television film Co-wrote with Ryan W. Smith	
2015	The Hollow	Yes	Story	Executive	Television film	
2016	The Night Before Halloween	Yes	Yes		Television film	
2017	Neverknock	Yes	Yes	Executive	Television film	
2017	Stickman	Yes	Yes	Executive	Television film	
2018	Dead in the Water	Yes			Television film	
2020–2021	Between Black and Blue	Yes	Yes	Yes	Documentary miniseries 4 episodes	
