= Confessions of a Crap Artist =

Novel by Philip K. Dick

- Cover of first edition (paperback)
- Author: Philip K. Dick
- Language: English
- Genre: Novel
- Publisher: Entwhistle Books
- Publication date: 1975
- Publication place: United States
- Media type: Print (Hardcover & Paperback)
- Pages: 171 pp
- ISBN: 0-9601428-2-7 (1978 Entwhistle paperback reissue)
- OCLC: 4111677
- Dewey Decimal: 813/.5/4
- LC Class: PZ4.D547 Co 1978 PS3554.I3

Confessions of a Crap Artist is a 1975 novel by Philip K. Dick, originally written in 1959. Dick wrote about a dozen non-science fiction novels in the period from 1948 to 1960; this is the only one published during his lifetime.

The novel chronicles a bitter and complex marital conflict in the rural Bay Area of 1950s Northern California. Each chapter is written in alternating perspective switching between first person perspective from the main characters as well as chapters written from a third person perspective. The novel contains only small amounts of the complex mystical and science fiction concepts that define much of Dick's work. Rolling Stone called it a "funny, horribly accurate portrait of a life in California in the Fifties".

== Plot ==
The novel's protagonist, the “crap artist” of the title, is Jack Isidore, a socially awkward, obsessive compulsive tire regroover who has been consumed with amateur scientific inquiry since his teens. He catalogs old science magazines, collects worthless objects, and believes disproved theories, such as the notions that the Earth is hollow or that sunlight has weight.

Broke, Jack eventually moves in with his sister's family in a luxurious farm house in rural West Marin County, California. On the farm, Jack happily does housework and cares for livestock. He also joins a small apocalyptic religious group, which shares his belief in extra-sensory perception, telepathy and UFOs and believes the world will end on April 23, 1959. However, most of his time is dedicated to a meticulous “scientific journal” of life on the farm, including his sister's marital difficulties.

Jack's sister, Fay Hume, is a difficult and subtly controlling woman who makes life miserable for everyone close to her, especially her misogynist husband Charley. Fay has an extramarital affair with a young grad student named Nat Anteil while Charley is in a hospital recovering from a heart attack. After Jack reports this to Charley, the latter plots to kill Fay.

Charley kills Fay's animals and then commits suicide, realising that Fay has led him to do this. However, his will stipulates that Jack is to inherit half the house. Fay must buy her brother out, because Jack does not want to leave. Jack then uses his half of the money he is paid to replace the slaughtered animals. Nat and his wife Gwen divorce, and Nat decides to stay with Fay. When the end of the world doesn't occur on the predicted date, Jack decides to seek psychiatric assistance.

== Film adaptation ==
In 1992, French director Jérôme Boivin released Confessions d'un Barjo (Barjo for the English-language market), based on the novel. The film follows the novel fairly closely, although Jack (played by Hippolyte Girardot) is given the nickname "Barjo" (loosely translated as nutcase) and is referred to by that name throughout the film. Also, the story is shifted to contemporary France.
