= Jana Pallaske =

German actress and singer

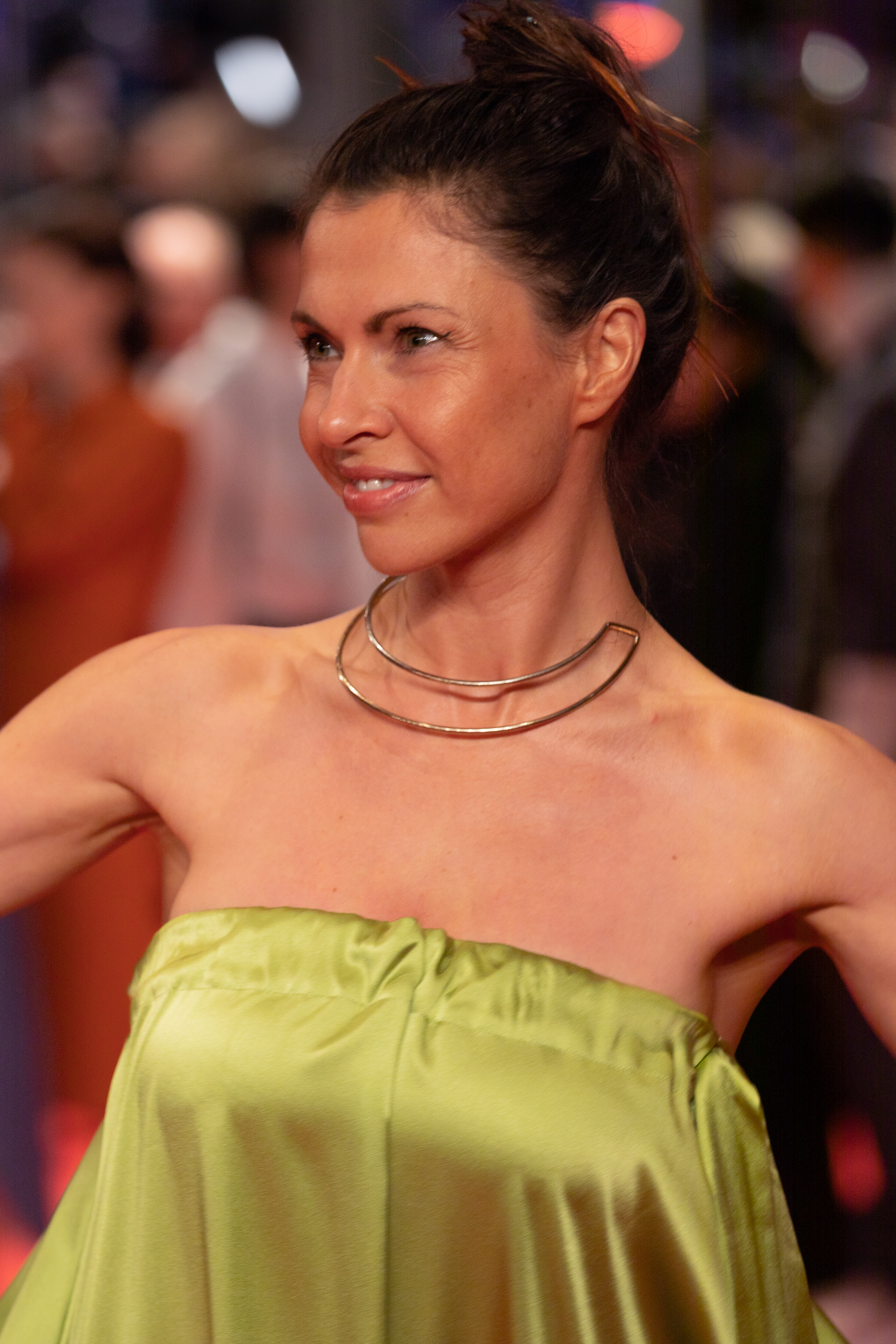
- Pallaske at the 70th Berlin International Film Festival, 2020
- Born: 20 May 1979 (age 47); East Berlin, East Germany
- Occupations: Actress; singer
- Years active: 2000–present

Jana Pallaske (born 20 May 1979) is a German actress and singer for the rock band Spitting Off Tall Buildings.

== Partial filmography ==
- Alaska.de (2000), as Sabine
- Jeans (2001), as Nina
- Engel & Joe (2001), as Joe
- Baader (2002), as Karin
- Extreme Ops (2002), as Kittie
- Tatort (2002–2018, TV Series), as Susanne Baumann / Daniela Mertens / Svenja
- Alarm für Cobra 11 – Die Autobahnpolizei (2003–2010, TV Series), as Hanna / Alicia Schulze / Annika Meier
- Love in Thoughts (2004), as Elli
- EuroTrip (2004), as Anna, The Camera Store Girl
- SK Kölsch (2004, TV Series), as Sandy
- Ein Fall für zwei (2005, TV Series)
- Stürmisch verliebt (2005, TV Movie), as Patrizia "Pat" Kolditz
- Polly Blue Eyes (2005), as Jale
- Happy as One (2006), as Hannah
- Die Cleveren (2006, TV Series), as Vicky
- Berndivent (2006, TV Series), as Sarah Bernard
- Die ProSieben Märchenstunde (2006, TV Series), as Maria
- Blackout – Die Erinnerung ist tödlich (2006, TV Mini-Series), as Butsche's Sister
- Vollidiot (2007), as Petra
- Alles Lüge – Auf der Suche nach Rio Reiser (2007, TV Movie), as Julia
- Berlin by the Sea (2008), as Margarethe
- Melodies of Spring (2008), as Katja
- Speed Racer (2008), as Delilah
- Palermo Shooting (2008), as Student
- Maja (2008, TV Series), as Paula Hilsch
- Waiting for Angelina (2008), as Mandy
- Screamers: The Hunting (2009), as Schwartz
- Kopf oder Zahl (2009), as Irina
- Phantom Pain (2009), as Nika
- Inglourious Basterds (2009), as Babette
- 12 Paces Without a Head (2009), as Okka
- Men in the City (2009), as Nina Hellmich
- Flemming (2009, TV Series), as Fenja Landers
- Snowblind (2010, TV Series), as Barbara Midnite
- SOKO Wismar (2010, TV Series), as Silke Jaspers
- Lasko – Die Faust Gottes (2010, TV Series), as Sina
- IK1 – Touristen in Gefahr (2011), as Lisa Blum
- Men in the City 2 (2011), as Nina Hellmich
- Geography of the Hapless Heart (2012), as Anna (segment "Berlin") – unfinished anthology film
- Fack ju Göhte (2013), as Charlie
- Crossing Lines (2013), as Kidnapper
- Cat.8 (2013, TV Series), as Jane
- Fack ju Göhte 2 (2015), as Charlie
- Burg Schreckenstein (2016), as Melanie
- Vampire Sisters 3: Journey to Transylvania (2016), as Anastasia
- Vier gegen die Bank (2016), as Heidi
- Fack ju Göhte 3 (2016), as Charlie
- Lassie Come Home (2020), as Franka
