= The Commuter (short story) =

1953 science fiction short story by Philip K. Dick

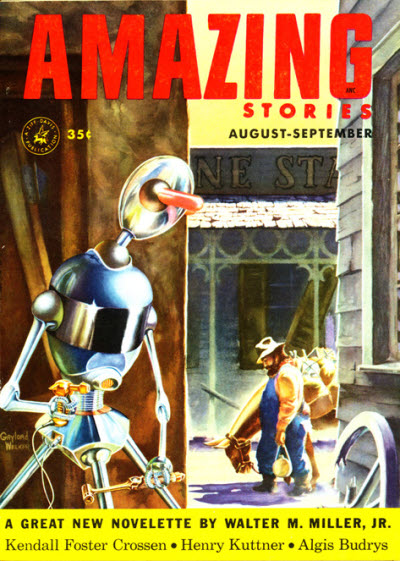
"The Commuter" was originally published in the August–September 1953 issue of Amazing Stories.

"The Commuter" is a science fiction short story by American writer Philip K. Dick, first published in the August–September 1953 issue of Amazing Stories. It has been reprinted over 20 times, including Croatian, Dutch, French, German and Italian translations. As with much of Dick's fiction, it is an exploration of the boundary of existence.

== Plot ==
A railway station manager encounters the eponymous commuter, who speaks of a town that cannot be found on any normal map. The commuter literally vanishes on close questioning about this ephemeral town. Based on the information the manager extracts from the commuter, he undertakes an investigation and boards a train the commuter claimed was scheduled to stop at the town. The station manager finds himself arriving at the non-existent town.

Subsequent investigation reveals that the town nearly existed. It was narrowly voted out of existence during a planning meeting, and the narrowness of this vote is directly reflected in the ephemeral nature of the town.

== Adaptation ==
The story was adapted by Jack Thorne into an episode of the Channel 4/Amazon Video anthology series Philip K. Dick’s Electric Dreams. Tom Harper directed the episode starring Timothy Spall, Tuppence Middleton, and Anne Reid.

=== Plot ===
Ed Jacobson is a railway worker at Woking station. His son, Sam, experiences psychotic episodes. When he is selling rail tickets at work, a woman named Linda asks for a ticket to a destination called Macon Heights that is not listed on any map. Intrigued, Jacobson takes the train indicated by Linda, then follows passengers who jump off the train and walk to an idyllic village that provides an escape from the traumas of their lives. On his return home, he experiences an alternate reality where his son was never born. He returns to Macon Heights and demands that Linda restore his original life, including his troubled son.

=== Cast ===
- Timothy Spall as Ed Jacobson
- Rebecca Manley as Mary Jacobson
- Anthony Boyle as Sam Jacobson
- Rudi Dharmalingam as Bob Paine
- Tuppence Middleton as Linda
- Anne Reid as Martine Jenkins
- Ann Akin as Dr. Simpson
- Hayley Squires as Waitress
- Tom Brooke as Tall Man in Light Coat
