= Alcon Entertainment =

American film production company

Alcon Entertainment, LLC
- Logo used since 1999
- Type: Private
- Industry: Film
- Predecessors: Village Roadshow Pictures (library only)
- Founded: January 24, 1997; 29 years ago
- Founders: Andrew Kosove; Broderick Johnson
- Headquarters: Los Angeles, California
- Key people: Broderick Johnson (CEO); Andrew Kosove (CEO); Steven Wegner (VP of development); Scott Parish (CFO); Kira Davis (former VP of production & marketing)
- Divisions: Alcon Interactive Group; Alcon Television Group; Alcon Sleeping Giant; Alcon Publishing; Alcon Animation Group
- Website: www.alconent.com

Alcon Entertainment, LLC is an American independent film and television production company, founded on January 24, 1997 by film producers Andrew Kosove and Broderick Johnson. Since its establishment, Alcon Entertainment has developed and financed films that are ultimately distributed – in the United States mostly, and internationally on occasion – by Warner Bros. Pictures, following a ten-year motion picture production agreement.

== History ==
Alcon Entertainment was established on January 24, 1997, being founded by film producers Broderick Johnson and Andrew Kosove, who are the co-CEOs of the company. The company is headquartered on Santa Monica Boulevard in Los Angeles, California.

Both Johnson and Kosove presented FedEx founder and chairman Frederick W. Smith with a proposal suggesting that an independent film company, backed by a capitalized individual or company, and aligned with a major studio for an exclusive distribution arrangement would reap profits on copyrighted assets over a set period of time.

On February 18, 1998, Alcon Entertainment set up two greenlight projects, with Warner Bros. distributing a single project. On May 15, 1998, Alcon signed a second deal with Warner Bros. in which Warner Bros. was allowed to distribute the film Lost & Found.

Alcon's first major feature film was the 1999 comedy Lost & Found. In March 2000, following the success of its second film My Dog Skip, Alcon entered into a long-term distribution agreement with Warner Bros. The agreement had Warner Bros. Pictures in charge of worldwide distribution of a minimum of 10 films produced and financed by Alcon over the next five years. The agreement also allowed Warner Bros. Pictures to co-finance certain pictures with Alcon.

Alcon and Warner Bros. Pictures signed a new agreement in February 2006, continuing their eight-year relationship, under which Warner Bros. Pictures would continue to distribute feature films developed and financed by Alcon. Alcon has the option to distribute its pictures internationally through Warner Bros. Pictures, but also has the flexibility instead to pre-sell rights through Summit Entertainment (later Lionsgate). Warner Bros. Pictures and Alcon extended the deal in 2015 which ended in 2019.

On September 28, 2003, Alcon Entertainment had launched its television arm, with an exclusive co-production agreement at television studio Warner Bros. Television.

In 2011, Alcon Entertainment acquired the entire brand and rights to the Blade Runner franchise, which encompasses movies, series, games and other franchise media such as books. On March 8, 2012, Alcon had signed an affiliate production company headed by 2S Films executive Molly Smith, Belle Pictures, to develop film projects.

On October 6, 2016, Alcon opened up a new division titled Alcon Interactive Group which continues Alcon's diversification beyond its core business of financing and producing feature films, having also established in the past years.

After the Village Roadshow Entertainment Group filed for Chapter 11 bankruptcy protection in March 2025, Alcon placed a bid of $416.5 million for its library the following month, with it being approved as the new stalking horse bid by Delaware bankruptcy judge Thomas Horan. On June 18, 2025, it was announced that Alcon's stalking horse bid worth $417.5 million had succeeded, giving it rights to VREG's library of 108 films, including intellectual properties, distribution rights, cash flows, overall rights and royalties, as well as its development slate of films and television series. On November 5, 2025, Alcon won the derivative rights to most of VREG's library.

== Filmography ==
Year	Film title	Distributor	Notes	Budget	Box office
1999	Lost & Found	Warner Bros.	First film	$30 million	$6,552,255
2000	My Dog Skip	Warner Bros.		$6 million	$35,512,760
2000	Dude, Where's My Car?	20th Century Fox	Uncredited	$13 million	$73,180,723
2001	The Affair of the Necklace	Warner Bros. Pictures	International distribution outside Latin America, the U.K., Ireland, Australia, New Zealand, France and Italy by Summit Entertainment	$30 million	$471,210
2002	Insomnia	Warner Bros. Pictures	Co-produced with Section Eight Productions; international distribution outside France, Germany and Austria by Summit Entertainment	$46 million	$113,714,830
2003	Love Don't Cost a Thing	Warner Bros. Pictures		$21 million	$21,924,226
2004	Chasing Liberty	Warner Bros. Pictures		$23 million	$12,313,323
2005	Racing Stripes	Warner Bros. Pictures	international distribution by Summit Entertainment	$30 million	$90,754,475
2005	The Sisterhood of the Traveling Pants	Warner Bros. Pictures	Co-produced with Alloy Entertainment, Di Novi Pictures and Martin Chase Productions	$25 million	$42,000,000
2006	16 Blocks	Warner Bros. Pictures	North American distribution only; produced by Millennium Films, Equity Pictures, Nu Image, Emmett/Furla Films, Cheyenne Enterprises, ContentFilm International and The Donners' Company	$55 million	$65,664,721
2006	The Wicker Man	Warner Bros. Pictures	North American distribution only; produced by Millennium Films, Saturn Films, Equity Pictures, Emmett/Furla Films and Nu Image	$40 million	$38,755,073
2007	P.S. I Love You	Warner Bros. Pictures	Co-produced with Grosvenor Park Productions; international distribution by Summit Entertainment	$30 million	$156,835,339
2008	One Missed Call	Warner Bros. Pictures	Co-produced with Kadokawa Pictures, Equity Pictures and Intermedia	$20 million	$45,847,751
2008	The Sisterhood of the Traveling Pants 2	Warner Bros. Pictures	Co-produced with Alloy Entertainment, Di Novi Pictures and Martin Chase Productions	$27 million	$44,352,417
2009	The Blind Side	Warner Bros. Pictures		$29 million	$309,208,309
2010	The Book of Eli	Warner Bros. Pictures	Co-produced with Silver Pictures; international distribution by Summit Entertainment	$80 million	$157,091,718
2010	Lottery Ticket	Warner Bros. Pictures	Co-produced with Cube Vision	$17 million	$24,719,879
2011	Something Borrowed	Warner Bros. Pictures	Co-produced with 2S Films; international distribution outside France and Italy by Summit Entertainment	$35 million	$60,183,821
2011	Dolphin Tale	Warner Bros. Pictures		$37 million	$95,404,397
2012	Joyful Noise	Warner Bros. Pictures		$25 million	$31,158,113
2012	What to Expect When You're Expecting	Lionsgate	Co-produced with Phoenix Pictures	$40 million	$41.102.171
2012	Chernobyl Diaries	Warner Bros. Pictures	North American, German, Austrian, Spanish and Japanese distribution only; produced by FilmNation Entertainment and Oren Peli/Brian Witten Productions	$1 million	$37,157,648
2013	Beautiful Creatures	Warner Bros. Pictures	Co-produced with 3 Arts Entertainment, Belle Pictures; international distribution by Summit Entertainment	$60 million	$60,052,138
2013	Prisoners	Warner Bros. Pictures	Co-produced with 8:38 Productions and Madhouse Entertainment; international distribution outside Australia, New Zealand, Italy and Spain by Summit Entertainment	$46 million	$122,126,687
2014	Transcendence	Warner Bros. Pictures	Co-produced with DMG Entertainment and Straight Up Films; international distribution outside China by Lionsgate under Summit Entertainment	$100 million	$103,039,258
2014	Dolphin Tale 2	Warner Bros. Pictures		$36 million	$57,824,533
2014	The Good Lie	Warner Bros. Pictures	Co-produced with Imagine Entertainment, Black Label Media and Reliance Entertainment; international distribution outside India by Lionsgate under Summit Entertainment	$20 million	$2,722,209
2015	The 33	Warner Bros. Pictures	Distribution outside Latin America, Portugal, the Middle East, Indonesia, Singapore, the Philippines, China, Korea and Taiwan only; produced by Phoenix Pictures	$26 million	$24,902,723
2015	Point Break	Warner Bros. Pictures	Co-produced with DMG Entertainment, Ehrman Productions and Babelsberg Studios; international distribution outside Latin America, the U.K., Ireland, China, Japan and the CIS by Lionsgate under Summit Entertainment	$100 million	$131,338,490
2016	No Manches Frida	Pantelion Films	Co-produced with Constantin Film	—N/a	$23,540,937
2017	Blade Runner 2049	Warner Bros. Pictures / Sony Pictures Releasing International	Co-produced with Columbia Pictures, Thunderbird Films and Scott Free Productions	$150–185 million	$259,239,658
2017	Father Figures	Warner Bros. Pictures	Co-produced with The Montecito Picture Company and DMG Entertainment	$25 million	$25,601,244
2018	12 Strong	Warner Bros. Pictures	Co-produced with Black Label Media, Jerry Bruckheimer Films and Torridon Films; international distribution by Lionsgate	$35 million	$62,928,960
2019	No manches Frida 2	Pantelion Films	Co-produced with Constantin Film	—N/a	$26,377,799
2022	Lullaby	Vertical Entertainment / Stage 6 Films	Co-produced with Envision Media Arts and Heroes and Villains Entertainment	$10 million	—N/a
2024	The Garfield Movie	Sony Pictures Releasing	First animated film; Co-produced with Columbia Pictures, DNEG Animation, Prime Focus, One Cool Group Limited, Wayfarer Studios, Stage 6 Films, John Cohen Productions and Andrews McMeel Entertainment	$60 million	$257,211,519
2026	Practical Magic 2	Warner Bros. Pictures	Acquired from Village Roadshow Pictures; co-produced with Di Novi Pictures, Fortis Films and Blossom Films	$75 million	$105,690,022
2026	The Social Reckoning	Sony Pictures Releasing	Co-produced with Columbia Pictures, The Gotham Group and Escape Artists	$30–42 million	$16,960,786
2027	Ocean's Eleven prequel	Warner Bros. Pictures	Acquired from Village Roadshow Pictures; co-produced by LuckyChap Entertainment and Everyman Pictures	—N/a	—N/a

== Alcon Television Group ==
Year	Title	Network	Notes	Seasons	Episodes
2015	Sinatra: All or Nothing at All	HBO	Co-produced with Jigsaw Productions and The Kennedy/Marshall Company	1	2
2015–2022	The Expanse	Syfy (2015–2018); Amazon Prime Video (2019–2022)	Co-produced with Penguin in a Parka, SeanDanielCo (2015–2018), Just So (2019–2022), Hivemind (2019–2022) and Amazon Studios (2019–2022); distributed by Legendary Television Distribution	6	62
2016–2018	Ice	Audience	Co-produced with Fuqua Films (2016), Entertainment One, IM Global Television (2016) and Bernero Productions (2018)	2	20
2017–2022	Pete the Cat	Amazon Prime Video	Co-produced with Amazon Studios, Appian Way Productions and Surfer Jack Productions; distributed by Cake Entertainment	2	41
2017	The Defiant Ones	HBO	Co-produced with Silverback 5150 Productions	1	4
2021–2022	Blade Runner: Black Lotus	Adult Swim; Crunchyroll	Co-produced with Williams Street	1	13
2026–present	Hey A.J.!	Disney Jr.	Co-produced with Surfing Giant Studios	1	25
2026	Blade Runner 2099	Amazon Prime Video	Co-produced with Scott Free Productions, Amazon MGM Studios, and Sony Pictures Television	1	8

== Alcon Interactive Group ==
Year	Title	Developer(s)	Platform(s)
2017	Blade Runner 2049 VR - Memory Lab	Magnopus	Oculus
2018	Blade Runner: Revelations	Seismic Games	Google Daydream
2021	In My Shadow	Playbae	Windows
2021	Blade Runner: Rogue	Next Games	iOS
2022	Blade Runner: Enhanced Edition	Nightdive Studios	Windows, PlayStation 4, Xbox One
2023	The Expanse: A Telltale Series	Telltale Games; Deck Nine Games	Windows, PlayStation 4, PlayStation 5, Xbox One, Xbox Series X/S
TBA	Blade Runner 2033: Labyrinth	Annapurna Interactive	Windows, TBA
TBA	The Expanse: Osiris Reborn	Owlcat Games	Windows, PlayStation 5, Xbox Series X/S

== Music ==
In 2014, Alcon partnered with Sleeping Giant Media to form ASG Music Group. ASG is a full service music company and record label. In 2017, ASG released the Blade Runner 2049 soundtrack, produced by Grammy nominated producer Michael Hodges, Kayla Morrison and Ashley Culp, with Epic Records. The album reached No. 1 on the Billboard Soundtrack Sales Charts.
