= The Kustomonsters =

Animated web series

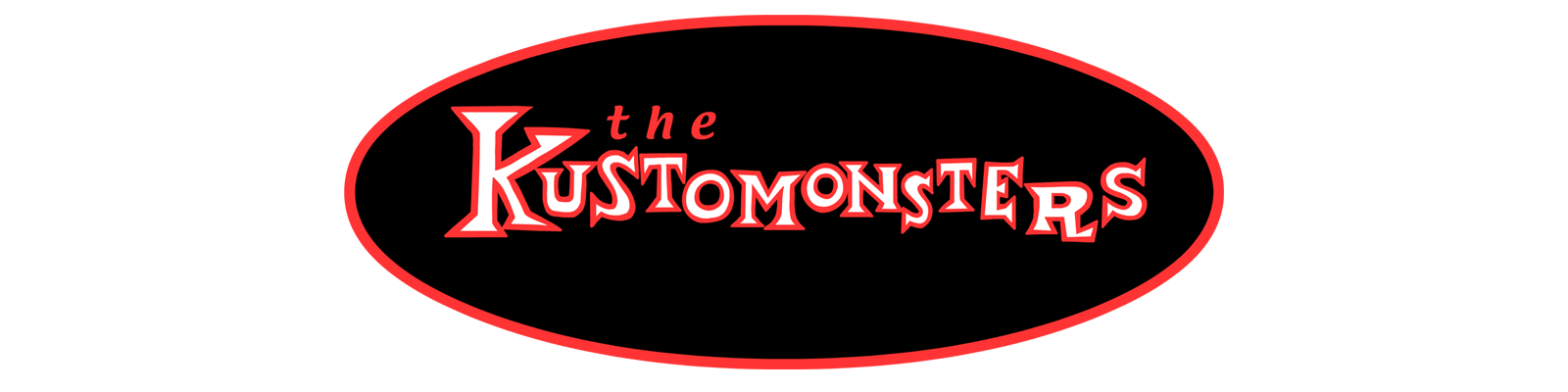

The Kustomonsters is an animated movie series and TV show created by, Craig Clark, an art rock, darkwave musician (Chorus of Souls on Fluxus Records), animator (Forrest Gump and The Simpsons). Clark produced the series as a compilation of his short films from 1983 to the present. The show also features short films from many other independent animators such as Michel Gagné, Mark Kausler, Mike Milo and Aaron Long (animator), Jessica Borutski, Hayk Manukyan, as well as many alternative music videos from bands like Celldweller, Monica Richards, Nymphs (band), and Shiny Toy Guns.

The show is a comedy take blending the 60's “Kustom Car Kulture” of Ed Roth with the spookiness of Hollywood horror monsters and vintage cartoons. “Mummy DaddyO” is the “horror host” and lead hipster of this bunch from Horror Heights. His sidekick, “Butterball the Skeleton”, joins animated puppet DaddyO as he hosts the show from the Ends Ville Coffeehouse.

The show currently airs in syndication on the OSI74 Roku network in the U.S. as well as Clark also released three Kustomonsters feature films, The Kustomonsters Movie and Kustomonsters 2, currently streaming on Tubi and Amazon Prime. A third Kustomonsters film, Kustomonsters 3 is streaming on OSI74 Roku, and a fourth Kustomonters film, Kustomonsters 4; Bikini Wars is now in production.
