= Epoch (Top Cow) =

- Cover of Epoch issue #1

Publication information
- Publisher: Top Cow Heroes and Villains Entertainment
- Schedule: Monthly
- Format: mini series
- Genre: Action, supernatural, thriller
- Publication date: August 2011
- No. of issues: 5

Creative team
- Created by: Heroes and Villains Entertainment
- Written by: Kevin McCarthy
- Artist(s): Paolo Pantalena, Paolo Barbieri
- Letterer: Troy Peteri
- Colorist(s): Jorge Fares, Bill Farmer

Epoch is a joint comic book venture of Top Cow Productions and Heroes and Villains Entertainment.

== History ==
Epoch premiered at San Diego Comic-Con in 2011. It is a five issue comic book mini series written by Kevin McCarthy, with art by Paolo Pantalena.

== Plot ==
While investigating the murder of his partner Michael, NYPD Detective Jonah Wright discovers not only his supernatural heritage but also a conspiracy that threatens to tear the fabric of our society. To expose the killer, Jonah must compete in EPOCH, an ancient fighting tournament that will determine the future of humanity.

=== Epoch #1 ===
NYPD Detective Jonah Wright and his partner Michael have been working a series of violent murders. Their only witness, Congresswoman Mya Tokage, agrees to give them a name - Wilfred Glendon - and an address with the promise of immunity. Upon arriving, however, Jonah and Michael find the suspect killed in the same manner as the other victims. The killer, still in the room, transforms into a blazing demon and takes down an entire SWAT team before punching a hole through Jonah's chest. Michael, who reveals himself to be an angel, gives chase. In the ensuing angel vs. demon battle, the demon leads Michael to a masked figure, who cuts off Michael's wings with a sword and kills him. Jonah, on the other hand, makes a miraculous recovery. Though placed on medical leave, he refuses to let the case rest. He recognizes the wounds on Michael's back as the same scars on his estranged father Gabriel. Jonah follows Gabriel to Chinatown, where he makes a startling discovery: Gabriel is part of a council of supernatural and mythological creatures.

=== Epoch #2 ===
Tobias Atrox, leader of the Angel Order, convinces the council to grant Jonah and Gabriel jurisdiction to search for Michael's killer. Jonah confronts Gabriel, who explains it all. Centuries ago, the Supernaturals, outnumbered by humans, decided to band together and form a council to ensure a peaceful co-existence. Their council head was chosen by EPOCH, a single combat tournament. Michael, an archangel, had been their leader until now. Gabriel, also an archangel himself, was groomed to succeed Michael as warrior of the Angel Order, but decided to cut off his own wings and became a mortal when he fell in love with a mortal woman - Jonah's mother. Meanwhile, Tobias tries to persuade his wife, Aliyah, to train Jonah into a warrior to compete in EPOCH. Aliyah reluctantly agrees. Following a lead in Wilfred Glendon's murder, Jonah and Gabriel go to the club run by the vampire Cyrus. Jonah helps Cyrus take care of Griffin, the troublesome warlock warrior. Cyrus denies having anything to do with the murders, but tells Jonah to "follow the blood". Jonah and Gabriel take a sample of Glendon's blood for toxicology, unaware that Michael's killers are watching them.

=== Epoch #3 ===
Jonah wakes up in his apartment and contemplates the past. There is a knock at the door. It is Tobias and Aliyah. Tobias tries to convince Jonah to represent the Angels in Epoch, and tells him that Aliyah will aid in his training. Jonah doesn't answer either way yet. At work, Jonah interrogates a hobo who saw Michael's murder. Jonah learns that they are looking for a demon that burns blue. That night, Jonah accepts Aliyah's help, and she flies them to a dormant volcano to begin training. After a rough start, Jonah learns quickly. Later, Jonah meets up with Gabriel at the Museum of Natural History to see Delphin (a troll) to follow up on their neurotoxin lead. Delphin says he'll have the results in a few days. Outside, Aliyah meets them. Gabriel sees that she is attracted to Jonah, and warns her about the magnetism of the human spirit. She decides to continue training Jonah anyway, and puts him through the fire test, where Jonah must set his arm on fire but ignore the pain. Jonah and Aliyah go to Teotihuacan to watch the first round of Epoch: Rafael, the vampire vs Damien, the demon. Damien wins, and Jonah recognizes beyond a doubt that Damien is the one who killed Michael.

=== Epoch #4 ===
Jonah heads to Stonehenge for his first round in Epoch. He fights and defeats Griffin, the warlock he was previously in a bar fight with. After the match, Delphin tells the Angels that the neurotoxin sample is definitely gorgon venom. They decide that it must have either been Mya Tokage or Nyx, and that if they can get one of their venom samples, they would be able to match it. Jonah is fighting Nyx in the next round, but in order to get her venom, he would have to be bit which would paralyze him. Later, Aliyah puts Jonah through a test to make him sprout his wings, but he fails. In the next round of Epoch, Damien defeats Grim, the troll champion. Jonah, despite being bit, manages to defeat Nyx at the Angor Wat Temple Complex. Jonah wakes up in his apartment with Gabriel waiting for him. Gabriel tells Jonah he is about to meet with Delphin to see if the venoms match. On his way out, Gabriel is intercepted by Mya Tokage. Aliyah comes to Jonah's apartment, they make love. Meanwhile, in the car Mya tells Gabriel that she was a part of the murder, and that Damien was indeed the one who killed Michael. She says that he wouldn't believe who their accomplice was even if she told him, so she's going to show him. Damien kills her when they arrive at the Cloisters Museum, and the hooded figure from the beginning kills Gabriel.

=== Epoch #5 ===
Jonah finds out about his father's murder, and resolves to kill Damien. Jonah fights Damien in plain sight. Damien defeats Jonah, but doesn't kill him because he wants to do it in Epoch so it will be official. Jonah meets up with Aliyah to tell her he has no chance against Damien, and is dropping out of Epoch. At Michael's funeral, Tobias gives Jonah an uplifting speech about faith, which combined with Jonah's awareness that the supernatural council is falling apart without the right leader, forces him to stay in Epoch. The final battle takes place in the Colosseum, between Jonah and Damien. Damien kills Jonah, but through his death Jonah is reborn with the full powers of an Archangel, wings and all. Jonah is forced to kill Damien before he can find out who Damien was working with. Jonah appoints Tobias as head of the council rather than himself, and resumes work as a cop in both worlds. At the very end, the reader is shown that it was Tobias who was working with Damien all along.

== Species in Epoch ==
These are the various supernatural races that have appeared in Epoch. They are called "Supernaturals" in the series.

=== Angels ===
Winged celestial beings originating from Heaven. There were once millions of angels, until a bloody civil war left the world with only one hundred. Dedicated to the protection of humanity, they became society's first responders and guardians (doctors, policemen, firemen, etc.). Angels are immortal, possess superhuman strength and speed, and are highly resistant to injury and extreme heat. Their wings allow them to fly with ease and they can retract their wings into their bodies in order to pass as human. Angels can be killed if their wings are first cut off, making them weak and-essentially-human. Most angels are peaceful creatures, however, the archangels are perfect warriors with superior abilities compared to other angels. They prefer the fighting styles of Jeet Kune Do and Aikido. Angels can mate with humans.

=== Demons ===
Eons ago, they fought the Great War against the angels, and were banned from Heaven. Rife with lust and desire, demons excel as lawyers, athletes, stockbrokers, ad execs, or any other high-stakes lifestyle that gets the adrenaline pumping, very much like vampires. Demons are immortal, possess superhuman strength and agility, are resistant to injury as well as immune to harm from extreme heat, and can set themselves on fire with no ill affects using a flammable chemical that secretes from their body when they use their powers, and each burn their own color. They can manipulate their personal fires to use as projectiles, protection from opponents, and other offensive weapons. They prefer to fight using Jiu Jitsu.

=== Vampires ===
Dark and mysterious undead beings who drink human blood to survive, their nocturnal nature make them perfect for the nightlife scene. Vampires are immortal, super-strong, super-fast, telepathic, and very agile. Their senses are razor-sharp. They prefer the Capoeira style of fighting. Their claws aid in fighting.

=== Werewolves ===
Werewolves are the supernatural world's version of organized crime. They run the docks, construction zones, waste management, taxi alliances, shipping, and other mafia-associated businesses. They rely on intimidation and brute strength to accomplish most of their goals. They depend on their superior strength and agility to out muscle and overwhelm an opponent in battle, and prefer the fighting styles of Muay Thai boxing and Krav Maga. Their bite transforms humans into werewolves.

=== Trolls ===
Born of the Earth, and a race of all males, nobody knows how the trolls were created. They are short tempered and reclusive, but known for their wisdom and intelligence. They are museum curators, inventors, librarians, and scientists who live long, quiet lives of solitude often dedicated to a single pursuit. Due to their tough, leathery skin, trolls have the best defensive abilities, but are very slow. They prefer using a combination of heavyweight boxing and old school pro wrestling. They can change into human form and are strong.

=== Warlocks ===
Warlocks are only different from humans in that their supernatural DNA enables them to control the elemental energy of their surrounding environment (levitate, cast lightning, hurl projectiles, teleport, etc.). Today, warlocks blend in with high society as captains of industry. They prefer the fighting style of Kung Fu.

=== Gorgons ===
All descendants of Medusa, gorgons are a vicious race of all-female serpentines who have sharp fangs, snake-like tongues, impenetrable scaly skin, and dragon-like tails. They have the ability to shape-shift, making them perfect politicians, strategists, or anything else that duplicity is an asset. In battle, gorgons are not very strong on defense against supernatural opponents, but have superior regenerative abilities that make them very resilient and virtually immortal. Their bite is highly venomous. Ninjutsu is their main fighting style.

=== Banshees ===
Banshees are an all-female race of fairy-like beings. They have retractable, razor-sharp, and needle-thin fingernails, and can also levitate. They're found in society as models, singers, entertainers, and assassins. Their fighting style is karate.

== Cast of characters ==
- Jonah Wright: The son of the Archangel Gabriel and an NYPD detective. A Nephilim and the last of the Archangel line. He began investigating Michael's murder, during which time he becomes aware of the existence of the supernatural. He was assigned to fight in Epoch to take service as Michael's successor. He was trained by Tobias' wife, Aliyah, who becomes sexually attracted to him despite his Humanity. After he defeats Nyx, he and Aliyah consummate their attraction.
- Gabriel/Gabe Wright: Jonah's somewhat-estranged father and a former Archangel. He teaches Jonah about the supernatural world and aids him in his training and trials in Epoch. He is killed by an unknown assassin.
- Michael: Jonah's cop partner, he was an Archangel until he was murdered by Damien.
- Tobias: An angel and a Council member who serves as The Leader of The Angel Order. He is the negligent husband of Aliyah. He is later revealed to be Damien's accomplice.
- Aliyah: The wife of Tobias. She possesses strength and speed beyond that of other angels, though she is not an Archangel. She was assigned to train Jonah for Epoch and to teach him how to tap into his angelic abilities, during which time she becomes attracted to him and they develop a close bond despite her initial criticism of his humanity. After Jonah's battle with Nyx, she and Jonah finally consummate their attraction.
- Cyrus: An ancient vampire council member and the leader of the vampires.
- Rafael: The warrior in Epoch representing the vampires, he was killed by Damien.
- Rasputin: Council member who is the current head of the werewolves.
- Luna: The werewolf warrior in Epoch.
- Bianca: Council member who is the head of the Wiccans.
- Griffin: A warlock who Jonah fights in a bar. Jonah then later defeats him again in the first round of Epoch at Stonehenge.
- Mya Tokage: Council member who is the head of the gorgons. She is a Congresswoman in the normal world, and gets mixed up in Michael's murder.
- Nyx: A gorgon warrior of Epoch who fights Jonah in the second round. During her fight with Jona, she bites him in the arm and infects him with her venom, which only serves to slightly weaken him, much to her surprise. Jonah overpowers and defeats her with ease before passing out.
- Giselle: Council member who is head of the banshees.
- Sloan: Banshee warrior in Epoch.
- Delphin: Council member who is the head of the trolls. An expert in supernatural hematology, he lives under the Museum of Natural History, and analyzes Glendon's blood for Jonah and Gabriel.
- Grim: Troll warrior in Epoch, who loses to Damien.
- Lilith: Council member who is the head of the demons.
- Damian: A corrupted demon and an achieved warrior of Epoch. His signature ability is his blue flames, which he emits when he uses his powers. He murders Michael, and is finally defeated and killed by Jonah in the final round of Epoch.

== See also ==
- Top Cow Productions
- Heroes and Villains Entertainment
