= Blade Runner: Black Lotus =

2021 Japanese anime series

Japanese name
- Kanji: ブレードランナー：ブラック・ロータス
Transcriptions
- Revised Hepburn: Burēdoran'nā: Burakku rōtasu
- Genre: Action; Science fiction; Tech noir
- Based on: Do Androids Dream of Electric Sheep? by Philip K. Dick
- Developed by: Kenji Kamiyama; Shinji Aramaki
- Written by: Eugene Son; Alex de Campi; Brandon Auman; Kenji Kamiyama; Margaret Dunlap
- Directed by: Kenji Kamiyama; Shinji Aramaki
- Opening theme: "Feel You Now" by Alessia Cara
- Composers: Michael Hodges; Gerald Trottman
- Countries of origin: United States; Japan
- Original languages: English; Japanese
- No. of episodes: 13

Production
- Executive producers: Broderick Johnson; Andrew Kosove; Ben Roberts; Laura Lancaster; Joseph Chou
- Producers: Scott Parish; Ben Cook; Eugene Son; Al Cuenca
- Editor: Go Sadamatsu
- Running time: 22 minutes
- Production companies: Alcon Television Group; Williams Street; Sola Digital Arts (Note: Co-production and animation services.)

Original release
- Network: Adult Swim (television); Crunchyroll (streaming)
- Release: November 14, 2021 – February 6, 2022

Blade Runner: Black Lotus (Japanese: ブレードランナー：ブラック・ロータス, Hepburn: Burēdorannā: Burakku Rōtasu) is a neo-noir science fiction animated miniseries and an installment in the Blade Runner franchise, which itself is based on the 1968 novel Do Androids Dream of Electric Sheep? by Philip K. Dick. The series aired from November 14, 2021, to February 6, 2022. It was a co-production between Adult Swim and Crunchyroll, in partnership with Alcon Television Group.

== Plot ==
Black Lotus takes place in Los Angeles in 2032, ten years into the aftermath of Blade Runner: Black Out 2022, but before 2036: Nexus Dawn, and centers on a female replicant protagonist. It also includes "familiar" characters from the Blade Runner universe.

== Characters ==
Elle
Voiced by: Arisa Shida (Japanese); Jessica Henwick (English)
A female replicant created for a secret and unknown purpose.
Joseph
Voiced by: Shinshu Fuji (Japanese); Will Yun Lee (English)
A mysterious figure who owns a spare parts junkyard in Los Angeles.
Alani Davis
Voiced by: Takako Honda (Japanese); Samira Wiley (English)
A fresh LAPD recruit.
Niander Wallace Jr.
Voiced by: Takehito Koyasu (Japanese); Wes Bentley (English)
Brilliant scientist working for his father.
Niander Wallace Sr.
Voiced by: Takaya Hashi (Japanese); Brian Cox (English)
Founder and CEO of the Wallace Corporation.
Marlowe
Voiced by: Taiten Kusunoki (Japanese); Josh Duhamel (English)
A deadly Blade Runner.
Josephine Grant
Voiced by: Yoshiko Sakakibara (Japanese); Peyton List (English)
The wife of the police chief.
Earl Grant
Voiced by: Hōchū Ōtsuka (Japanese); Stephen Root (English)
Police Chief of the LAPD.
Doc Badger
Voiced by: Takayuki Kinba (Japanese); Barkhad Abdi (English)
A black market dealer.
Senator Bannister
Voiced by: Masane Tsukayama (Japanese); Gregg Henry (English)
A politician with strong feelings on replicant production.
Doctor M
Voiced by: Akio Nojima (Japanese); Henry Czerny (English)
A brilliant doctor and professor of medicine.
Hooper
Voiced by: Kazuki Yao (Japanese); Jason Spisak (English)
A journalist in the pocket of the Wallace Corporation.
Selene
Voiced by: Yoko Honno (Japanese); Alessia Cara (English)
A replicant nightclub singer

== Production and release ==
The anime was announced back in November 2018. The series was animated by Sola Digital Arts with Shinji Aramaki and Kenji Kamiyama serving as co-directors. Shinichirō Watanabe, director of Blade Runner Black Out 2022, served as a creative producer. It aired on Adult Swim's Toonami programming block in the United States from November 14, 2021, to February 6, 2022. Crunchyroll also streamed the series in Japanese with English subtitles.

Canada's Corus Entertainment announced at their June 2021 upfronts that the series would air in the Fall on Adult Swim Canada. It would later be confirmed that the series would air in simulcast with the U.S.

In July 2021, both Japanese and English casts were revealed along with the announcement of a planned panel for the virtual 2021 San Diego Comic-Con. The opening theme is "Feel You Now" by Alessia Cara.

On September 28, 2022, Jason DeMarco, the senior vice president of action and anime programming for Warner Bros. Discovery, confirmed that the series was written off by Warner Bros. Discovery after it had been removed from Adult Swim's website.

== Episodes ==
No.	Title	Storyboarded by	Written by	Animation supervised by	Original release date (Note: Adult Swim listed the series premiere on November 13, 2021, at 12:00 a.m. (24:00) EST/PST, which is effectively November 14. The English dub aired simultaneously in the United States and Canada, while the English sub launched simultaneously on Crunchyroll.)
SP	"Benefit or Hazard"	N/A	N/A	N/A	November 7, 2021
A special behind-the-scenes look into the making of Blade Runner: Black Lotus in a 7-minute short film documentary.
1	"City of Angels"	Shinji Aramaki	Eugene Son	Sameer Hirlekar	November 14, 2021
In October 2032, Elle wakes up in the back of a transport vehicle, with a lotus tattoo on her back shoulder and amnesia. She also has an encrypted data device. After reaching Los Angeles, she wanders around until being attacked by a gang. During this confrontation, she remembers her name. Recalling where she lives, Elle is directed to a now-unfamiliar building and encounters Doc Badger, who welcomes her into his shop. Elle hides as her attackers barge in, asking Doc if he had seen Elle or her device, to which he denies. After they leave, Elle asks if Doc can unlock the device, believing it will help recover her memories. He agrees to help if she prevents the gang from giving him trouble again. Elle incapacitates the gang, killing their leader and demanding the rest leave Doc alone. Elle then remembers killing a man who she recalls as attacking her in the desert. Elle returns to Doc's shop and learns that he cannot decode the device. However, he tells her an upstairs neighbor may be able to help. He takes her to the top floor of the apartment complex, where they find Joseph drunk and passed out on his couch.
2	"All We Are Not"	Shinji Aramaki	Alex de Campi	Sameer Hirlekar	November 14, 2021
Elle and Doc show Joseph the encrypted data device. He reluctantly agrees to help decrypt it. There, the television shows a meeting between Senator Bannister and Niander Wallace, Sr. is shown. She recognizes Bannister as someone who hunted her in the desert. She leaves the apartment with the data device, tracks down Bannister and steals a taxi to pursue him. She disables his security and confronts him inside a private balcony of a boxing arena. Bannister reveals that Elle is a replicant and a fight ensues. Refusing to believe Bannister, Elle drops him off the balcony, killing him. At Wallace company headquarters, Wallace Sr. discusses Niander Wallace Jr.'s lack of progress in the memory development field. Wallace Sr. then learns of Bannister's death. Officer Alani Davis arrives at the scene of Bannister's murder. Trying to stop Elle, she notices her tattoo, but gives up to investigate the scene. Later, another police officer chases Elle down an alley, to no avail. In the alley, she remembers being hunted in the desert alongside other replicants. Joseph then approaches Elle and shoots her, incapacitating her.
3	"The Human Condition"	Masayuki Miyaji	Brandon Auman	Raul Carvajal Soriano	November 21, 2021
Elle awakes in Joseph's apartment, who explains that he found her by using a police radio and has gone back to decoding her data device. Elsewhere after a brief scuffle, Officer Davis gets Drove to speak to her regarding his gang's encounter with Elle. Back at the apartment, Elle asks Joseph what a replicant is, believing she might be one. Joseph checks her eye for a serial number, a hallmark of Nexus-8 replicants. Since Elle is still unsure, Joseph brings out a machine to perform a Voight-Kampff test on her. When asked if she recalls being in love, Elle recalls someone who gave her the black lotus tattoo, saying it is a symbol of purity. Joseph ends the test, assuring her that she is not a replicant. At Wallace headquarters, Wallace Jr. stressed that Senator Bannister's death would make it less likely for replicant production to be legalized, though Wallace Sr. is not so worried. After a rest in the apartment, Elle awakes and discovers the data device is decrypted, uncovering footage of a replicant hunting trip by Bannister and Hooper. Someone in the recording notes that the replicants they hunt were created to be fully submissive to humans.
4	"The Doll Hunt"	Shinji Aramaki	Kenji Kamiyama & Eugene Son	Raul Carvajal Soriano	November 28, 2021
Elle receives a tattoo from her boyfriend. She awakes confused in the same location, now completely dilapidated. Once outside, she finds strangers who also cannot remember how they got there. Hunters – Bannister, Hooper, Earl Grant, and Josephine Grant – open fire on the group calling them "dolls." Elle hides with a girl named Miu, and they take one of the hunters' buggy and flee with two other "dolls". Elle eventually loses control of the vehicle and it crashes. Elle and Miu survive the wreck and Hooper is left alone by the hunters to conduct an experiment. He kills Miu to see if Elle will attack in retaliation. After Hooper kicks her multiple times, Elle, whose eyes are now glowing, stabs him to death with his knife. Elle takes his camera and hops on a transport vehicle. As her memory fully returns in the present, she now knows what she is and vows kill all the hunters as revenge. Meanwhile, Officer Davis confronts Chief Grant about her belief that a replicant killed Bannister. Grant shrugs her statements off and asks her to leave the evidence she gathered. He examines Davis' sketch of Elle's tattoo, cursing as he tosses it back down.
5	"Pressure"	Shingo Natsume	Eugene Son	Raul Carvajal Soriano	December 5, 2021
Blade Runner Marlowe kills a replicant in a bus. Grant reports to Niander Wallace, Sr. that Elle survived the hunt and promises to eliminate her. At the apartment complex, Elle asks Joseph to help her track down the hunters. As she sharpens the katana from Doc's shop, Joseph uses an Esper to help identify her targets. Grant commands any available officers to eliminate Elle, referred to by the department as Black Lotus. Officer Davis suggests he warn them that Black Lotus is potentially a replicant, but he insists that she is human. As officers flood the streets searching for Elle, Grant learns from Davis' evidence that Elle may have connections to Doc and orders a SWAT team on his shop. The SWAT breaks into the shop, but find only Joseph, who orchestrated the bait, while Doc prints photos of the hunters in Joseph's apartment. Elle goes to the Grants' apartment complex, where his wife, Josephine, resides.
6	"The Persistence of Memory"	Tensai Okamura	Margaret Dunlap	Raul Carvajal Soriano	December 12, 2021
Josephine expresses insecurity with her husband on their apartment's current security detail. Davis sees Grant leave headquarters and tails him. Meanwhile, Marlowe tells the officers to release Joseph, as they will not find anything on him. Marlowe receives a call from Grant, ordering him to go to his apartment. Josephine spots Elle and fires a handgun, missing. Elle ties Josephine to a chair, who insists she was only a spectator in the hunt and that they were invited by Grant's friend, Doctor M, and does not know who planned it. Grant arrives at the apartment and attacks Elle. After a struggle, Elle stabs Grant with her blade. Before dying, he fires his gun, accidentally hitting his wife in the chest. When Davis arrives, Josephine and Grant are already dead. Davis and Elle start talking when Marlowe crashes through the window. There is a standoff between Marlowe and Davis, but he brushes her off and fights Elle through the apartment. His shotgun is fired into the wall, breaking open a gas line above a stove. Elle uses the opportunity to spark a flame, causing an explosion that blasts her out of the complex.
7	"Reality"	Naoki Kusumoto	Alex de Campi	Raul Carvajal Soriano	December 19, 2021
At his apartment, Joseph treats Elle's wounds. Davis arrives, and Elle hides. Mentioning Joseph's past as a Blade Runner, Davis tries to question him, to no avail. Meanwhile, Niander Wallace, Jr. indicates to his father that he has been locked out of his office. Due to Elle's slayings, Wallace Sr. intends to cover the company's tracks, as their company created her. Sr. says that the company will be selling its Tyrell assets, including the replicant program. Jr. insists that his replicants are flawless and that Sr. will realize this. Elle enters Doctor M's work office building, incapacitates a guard and trips a laser, which allows M to stun her. She awakes restrained to a machine which M and his colleague Goodman use to view her memories, noting that some are remembered by Elle differently than were programmed and some were given to her by someone skilled in memory implantation. Elle breaks free from her restraints and grabs Goodman. Holding her blade to M's neck, Elle learns that Sr. orchestrated the Doll Hunt. Elle kills M and knocks out the arriving guards. Frightened, Goodman confirms that her memory of being by the pool with her boyfriend was real.
8	"The Davis Report"	Shinji Aramaki	Eugene Son	Raul Carvajal Soriano	January 2, 2022
On request of the L.A. civilian police oversight commission, Officer Alani Davis is interrogated by Investigator Alan Chen due to her proximities to the deaths of Senator Bannister and Chief Grant. She recounts her investigation and pursuit of Black Lotus. Chen expresses doubt in Davis' account and her assertion that Black Lotus is a replicant. Davis insists that Black Lotus is different from Nexus-8 models and concludes that someone has illegally resumed replicant production. Davis discovered that the Grants' and Hooper's vacation dates lined up and Hooper's last-known coordinates placed him in the Nevada desert. Chen agrees to investigate the area, where they find the remains of replicants. Although Chen suggests that she will be commended, upon her return to the LAPD, Davis learns she has been placed on leave for at least three months due to alleged delusional behavior. She finds a newspaper that reports rumors of Tyrell assets being put up for sale by the Wallace Corporation.
9	"Free Will"	Masayuki Miyaji	Brandon Auman	Raul Carvajal Soriano	January 9, 2022
Elle reveals to Joseph that she intends to assassinate Niander Wallace, Sr. Joseph later secretly phones someone, asking if he were to go through with the plan, would "she" be freed afterward. Elle infiltrates the Wallace Corp and incapacitates two guards to enter the elevator, where she shoots a camera. This prompts security agent Hignight to lock all doors and elevators, sealing Wallace Sr. in his penthouse. Elle escapes the locked elevator and is confronted by guards. She escapes them thanks to sniper support by Joseph. Marlowe later intercepts her. In the ensuing scuffle, Marlowe injures her, but is shot in the shoulder by Joseph, allowing Elle to escape. After a hand scanner identifies her as Wallace Jr., Elle enters the penthouse and searches for Wallace Sr., who repeatedly shoots her with a handgun. Writhing in pain, Elle asks why Wallace organized the hunt, but Sr. instead expresses his misgivings about her insistence to have free will as a replicant. A struggle ensues, ending with Elle killing Sr. with his own gun. When security arrives, Elle dives out the window and is caught by Joseph, who flies them away on his motorbike as she huddles close to him.
10	"Clair de Lune"	Kazuya Murata	Margaret Dunlap	Raul Carvajal Soriano	January 16, 2022
Joseph tells Elle of a time he fell in love with replicant singer Selene. Despite knowing of Joseph's existence, Selene did not try to hide. Joseph continued to visit the bar where she sang at for several nights until Marlowe found out what was going on. He demanded Joseph to retire Selene, or else he would do it himself. That night, Marlowe told Selene that it would be her last performance. As such, Selene bid farewell to her audience before singing one last song. Outside, Joseph and Selene kissed, and then, he killed her. Joseph cannot shake this memory and remembers the bar every night. Elle recalls being with her boyfriend at the pool and asks him why he has not been searching for her. The boyfriend suggests that perhaps it is she who should be looking for him. Elle proclaims her desire to find the man in her memory, prompting Joseph to retrieve a device from Doc's shop, which allows her to draw a sketch of the man. Joseph recognizes the man in the sketch as Niander Wallace, Jr. Meanwhile, Jr. puts a black lotus tattoo on another replicant at the same pool. Joseph calls him. He learns that their arrangement was to help Jr., as Joseph had originally believed.
11	"All the Best Memories"	Tomomi Kamiya	Eugene Son	Raul Carvajal Soriano	January 23, 2022
Wallace Jr. commands Joseph to retire Elle. As the news eulogizes Wallace Sr., Jr. reflects on his new freedom and his plans to create a perfect world. Meanwhile, Joseph suggests that Elle have Goodman erase her bad memories so that she can be free from them. At Goodman's lab, they are informed there is no safe way for select replicant memories to be purged and that Elle would need to erase all of them. She decides to go through with this and is put into Goodman's memory machine. Joseph then states that Jr. was the man from her memory and had created her to kill Sr.; Joseph was assigned to guide Elle through the assassination. Joseph then leaves and calls Jr., saying that Elle had been retired. Not trusting Joseph, Jr. assigns Water Lily to kill Elle. Davis is paged by Joseph, who mentions where Elle is and asks her to arrest and protect her. Water Lily enters the lab, killing several guards and Goodman, who shuts down the machine before dying. Meanwhile, Joseph returns to his apartment and calls Marlowe to talk about Black Lotus.
12	"Artificial Souls"	Tensai Okamura	Brandon Auman	Raul Carvajal Soriano	January 30, 2022
Elle and Water Lily fight until LAPD officers burst in, prompting the two to escape the facility. In an alley, Elle is met by Davis, who talks about her discovery of replicant bodies in the desert. Davis offers her protection so she can help bring Wallace Jr. to justice. Elle, not trusting her, flees. Davis calls the acting chief of police to report Jr.'s involvement in the Black Lotus case. However, she is impaled by Water Lily before she can relay the information. Marlowe arrives at Joseph's apartment and asks where Elle is, knowing Joseph has developed feelings and is protecting her. The ensuing fight ends with Joseph killing Marlowe, who was Selene's actual killer, and losing consciousness. Elle later awakes Joseph, who learns that she did not receive the memory wipe. Joseph advises that she leave the city. However, Elle points out that Jr. still poses a threat to them and vows to kill him.
13	"Time to Die"	Akitoshi Yokoyama & Shinji Aramaki	Eugene Son	Raul Carvajal Soriano	February 6, 2022
Elle infiltrates the former building of Tyrell Corp, disabling guards on her way to Jr. Inside his office, Jr. compliments Elle upon her success in becoming exactly what he intended for her. Elle attempts to attack him, but fails to do so due to her programming. Water Lily attacks and the two replicants engage in a sword fight. Elsewhere, Joseph enters the replicant manufacture room to plant explosives. Jr. then finds Joseph, having collapsed to the floor, and takes the detonator from him. Elle subdues Water Lilly, whom Jr. embraces. However, noting that she is flawed, he then kills her with her sword. Jr. then offers Elle a place by his side, and she slashes his eyes with her sword. Elle retrieves the detonator and tries to escape with Joseph. However, he pushes Elle out of the room and seals himself inside before detonating the explosives, killing himself in the process. One month later, Davis returns to work in a wheelchair. A now blind Jr. plans to proceed with his plans to replace humanity with his replicants. At Joseph's apartment, Doc finds Elle's sword. She leaves Los Angeles, driving out into the desert on Joseph's motorbike.

== Music ==
Blade Runner: Black Lotus (Original Television Soundtrack)

Soundtrack album by Michael Hodges & various artists
- Released: November 5, 2021
- Genres: Hip hop, R&B, alternative rock
- Length: 43:00
- Label: Alcon Sleeping Giant (ASG)
- Producers: Michael Hodges & others

=== Track listing ===
Blade Runner: Black Lotus (Original Television Soundtrack) track listing
No.	Title	Lyrics	Music	Performer(s)	Length
1.	"Feel You Now" (OP / S1E1 ED)	Alessia Cara & others	Michael Hodges	Alessia Cara	3:07
2.	"Water" (S1E2 ED)	Sam Nelson Harris & others	Michael Hodges & Sam Nelson Harris	X Ambassadors	3:13
3.	"Home" (S1E3 ED)	Esther Jungclaus & others	Michael Hodges & others	Walk Off the Earth	2:52
4.	"Evil" (S1E4 ED)	Michael Hodges	Michael Hodges	Daya	2:47
5.	"By My Side" (S1E5 ED)	Alexander Tidebrink & Michael Hodges	Michael Hodges & Alexander Tidebrink	A7S	2:45
6.	"After You" (S1E6 ED)	Kyle Trewartha & others	Michael Hodges & Grey	Grey	2:39
7.	"Save Myself" (S1E7 ED)	Kiana Ledé & others	Michael Hodges & Ghian Wright	Kiana Ledé	2:49
8.	"Intuition" (S1E8 ED)	Salem Ilese & others	Michael Hodges	Salem Ilese	2:50
9.	"Rescue Me" (S1E9 ED)	Michael Hodges & others	Michael Hodges & Alesso	Alesso & Danna Paola	2:52
10.	"What Happens Next"			Tori Kelly	3:02
11.	"Thrash"			G-Eazy	2:39
12.	"Circles"			Iann Dior	2:57
13.	"Perfect Weapon" (S1E13 ED)	Sam Nelson Harris & Michael Hodges	Michael Hodges	070 Shake	2:56
14.	"Last Goodbye"			Alessia Cara	2:35
15.	"Supahuman"			Michael Hodges & Lord Netty	2:47
Total length:					43:00

== Reception ==
On Rotten Tomatoes, the series has a rating of 71% based on 7 reviews.

== Comic sequel ==
A four issue comic, serving as a sequel to the anime, was released in 2022. The first volume ran from August 10 to November 2, 2022. The collected version is titled Blade Runner: Black Lotus - Leaving L.A. In February 2024, the editor, David Leach, confirmed on Twitter that a second volume was in development. Titled Blade Runner: Black Lotus - Las Vegas, this second volume ran for another four issues, from September 17, 2025, to March 4, 2026.

== See also ==
- List of adaptations of works by Philip K. Dick
