= Tracker (comics) =

- Cover of Tracker first look issue

Publication information
- Publisher: Top Cow Heroes and Villains Entertainment
- Schedule: Monthly
- Format: mini series
- Genre: Crime, Supernatural, Thriller
- Publication date: November 2009 – March 2010
- No. of issues: 5

Creative team
- Created by: Jonathan Lincoln
- Written by: Jonathan Lincoln
- Artist(s): Francis Tsai, Derec Donovan, Abhishek Malsuni, Shashank Mishra, JD Smith, Darick Robertson
- Letterer: Troy Peteri

Tracker is a joint comic book venture of Top Cow Productions and Heroes and Villains Entertainment. It was written by Jonathan Lincoln and has art done by Francis Tsai, Derek Donovan, and Abhishek Malsuni.

== History ==
Tracker premiered at San Diego Comic-Con in 2009. Tracker is a five-issue comic book mini-series written by Jonathan Lincoln with art by Francis Tsai, Derec Donovan and Abhishek Malsuni.

== Plot ==
Tracker tells the story of an FBI agent named Alex O’Roark, whose pursuit of a serial killer leads him to unexplored territory when it is revealed the killer is also a werewolf.

=== Tracker #1: "Survivor" ===
FBI Agent Jezebel Kendall is called to the scene of a grisly murder - all passengers on the Blue Line bus have been killed. Jezebel thinks this is the work of Herod, a psychopath killer the FBI has been tracking. Amongst the bodies she finds her partner, Agent Alex O'Roark, barely breathing. Alex miraculously survives, but only with fragmented memories of the incident. He's approached by a mysterious doctor, Cyril Tucker, who tells Alex to contact him once his memory returns. Alex goes back to work; with the help of Agent Isaiah Grant, commander of the FBI's SWAT team, Alex and Jezebel anticipate Herod's next move. Herod kills the only other survivor of the bus attack; Alex tracks him down, but soon loses him. Alex's obsession with the case takes a toll on his personal life. He suddenly loses his temper, has a fight with his girlfriend, Tory Reyes, and storms out. He goes to a bar and leaves a message for Dr. Tucker. After downing shot after shot, yet still unable to wind down, Alex goes looking for trouble, which he finds in the form of a gang threatening a girl. Instead of showing them his badge, he decides to fight them. As the gang swarms over him, Alex transforms into a half-man, half-beast creature and tears the gang apart.

=== Tracker #2: "Face of a Killer" ===
Alex wakes up in Dr. Tucker's lab and finds one of the gang members on the operating table next to him, barely alive. To his horror, Alex realizes this isn't Herod's work, but his own. Dr. Tucker confirms his suspicion by telling Alex that Herod is a werewolf, and, because Herod bit him, Alex is now one too. Alex refuses to believe him and leaves, not knowing that Tucker has planted a tracking device on him. With his newly acquired, sharper senses, Alex remembers more of the attack and tracks the killer down as Conrad Landon, a truck driver who was bitten by a homeless man a while back. Alex, Jezebel and Grant go to the garbage dump where Conrad used to work. They find him hiding here. Alex chases after him, but when Conrad pleads with him, Alex realizes he cannot let the killer instinct take over. He lets Conrad go and tells his partners that Conrad isn't the killer. Conrad arrives home to find his mother murdered and Herod there, waiting for him.

=== Tracker #3: "Sire" ===
Things between Alex and Tory are still rocky - she's jealous of Jezebel, and upset that Alex won’t touch her. Secretly, he is afraid of being intimate with her, fearing of turning into a werewolf in her presence. They find Conrad Landon's severed head at their front door. Alex is puzzled as to why Herod is suddenly taunting them. From Herod's "calling cards" - pages of Bible with passages about King Herod that he leaves at the crime scenes - Alex, Jezebel and Grant find that the Bibles were shipped to an old hotel. Herod's room, however, is empty save for Conrad's headless corpse. While cross-checking similar case, Alex spots a photo of Dr. Tucker taken at one of the crime scenes. Alex goes to confront Tucker, who tells him that Herod has been living and killing for much longer than other werewolves, because he's been drinking lupines' blood, taken when feral - which is why he attacked Conrad on the bus, in order to get his blood. Tucker has been developing a cure for the werewolf curse - "wolfsbane" - but it only works with the blood of the sire, the one who turns the subject into a werewolf. Alex agrees to be retrained as part of a treatment to help him remember Herod's face. As Alex turns feral, Tucker extracts Alex's blood. He then injects the blood into the gang member that Alex attacked, whom he called "Rosemar" (because of the partly erased "Rosemary" tattoo on his chest.)

=== Tracker #4: "Watcher" ===
Alex and Jezebel go to a middle school after receiving tips that a man fitting Herod's description has been stalking the parking lot. Alex soon finds Herod's next intended victim - a sixth grader named Jack Rempel. Against Grant's protest, Alex decides to use Jack as bait. Unbeknownst to them, Tucker and his colleagues - all working for a shady organization called the Handel Foundation - have warned Herod of the trap, because they don't want the government to find out about Herod. At home, Tory prepares a romantic dinner for Alex, but he has to leave for the stake-out at little Jack's house. Tory warns him that she won't be here when he gets back. Alex talks to Jezebel about it, and for once their romantic tension becomes clear. However, they're interrupted by Jack, who knows he's being followed. Alex tries to reassure him, when Jack is grabbed by Herod. Herod sets up an explosion as a diversion and takes Jack to an underground drain tunnel. Alex finally has his confrontation with Herod in the tunnel. Again he refuses to let loose the beast within, and Herod escapes. Herod then arrives at Alex and Tory's house and attacks Tory.

=== Tracker #5: "Rogue" ===
With Tory kidnapped by Herod, Alex is taken off the case. He shows Dr. Tucker the Bible passage Herod left. Tucker deduces that Herod wants a trade - Tory for little Jack Rempel. To save Tory, Alex decides to risk breaking into FBI's Headquarters where Jack is being kept. With Tucker's help, Alex gets Jack out and brings him to the meeting place - an abandoned warehouse. After handing Tory to Tucker, he goes back to face Herod. The FBI tracks Tucker's van to the warehouse. Inside, Alex and Herod are still fighting. Herod convinces Alex to let him live, because if Herod dies, so will Alex's chance of being cured. Alex doesn't listen. Just as he's about to finish Herod, however, the SWAT team, led by Grant, bursts in and takes them down with gas grenades. Alex wakes up in the hospital with Tory next to him, wearing the engagement ring he's been trying to give to her for so long. Little Jack survives, but his parents still make him sleep in the cellar. Meanwhile, back at his lab, Dr. Tucker is working on "Rosemar." It turns out that Tucker is keeping Herod alive, hoping to make Herod work for them once he's strong enough. Rosemar then sits up on the operating table, revealing his new face, which has been surgically transformed into that of Alex O’Roark.

== Cast of major characters ==
In Order of Appearance

- Special Agent Jezebel Kendall
- Special Agent Alejandro 'Alex' O'Roark
- Dr. Cyril Tucker
- Tory Reyes
- Special Agent Isaiah Grant
- Special Agent in Charge Louis Barret
- Herod

== Reception ==
IGN's Jesse Schedeen rated the first issue a 4.4 out of 10 saying, "Tracker is too devoid of interesting qualities to be recommended to the horror or detective-loving crowds."

== See also ==
Top Cow Productions
