= Michael Hodges (producer) =

American songwriter

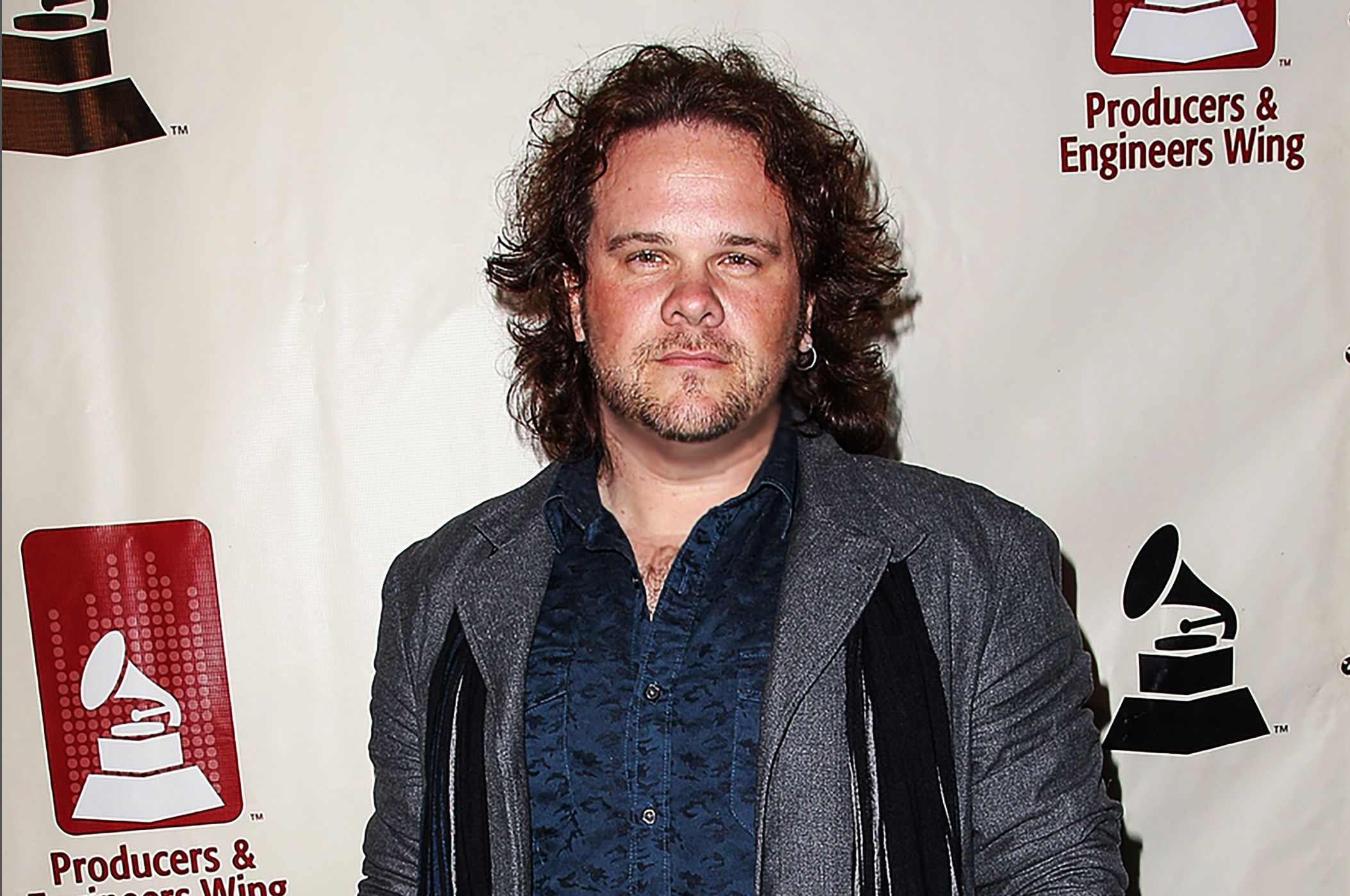
- Michael Hodges at Grammys P&E Red Carpet 2013

Background information
- Born: Michael E. Hodges; Little Rock, AR, US
- Origin: Nashville, Tennessee
- Genres: pop; pop rock; acoustic rock; alternative rock; hip hop; adult contemporary; television
- Occupations: singer-songwriter, record producer, composer, musician
- Instruments: vocals; guitar; piano; keyboards
- Years active: 1994–present
- Labels: Epic; ASG; Sony; Universal
- Website: sleepinggiant.media

Michael Hodges is an American singer-songwriter, record producer, composer, executive music producer and music executive best known for his work in music for film and television most notably on The Garfield Movie (2024), Blade Runner 2049 (2017), Point Break (2015), The Expanse (2015–2020) and Pete the Cat (2017–2022). He has received three Grammy nominations for his work as a songwriter and producer. In 2017, Hodges was an executive music producer on Blade Runner 2049, produced the Blade Runner 2049 soundtrack and co-wrote and produced the only original song on the album "Almost Human" performed by Lauren Daigle. In October 2017, Hodges signed on as executive music producer and co-composer of the Amazon Original Series Pete the Cat. In 2018, The Blade Runner 2049 Soundtrack, co-produced by Hodges, was nominated for a Grammy for Best Score Soundtrack for Visual Media. The album debuted at No. 1 in the "Billboard" Soundtrack Sales Charts and was nominated for the BAFTA Award for Best Film Music at the 71st British Academy Film Awards. In 2023, it was announced that Hodges would be an executive producer on Hey A.J.!, a Disney Junior series that was released in January 2026. In 2024, Hodges was the Executive Music Producer for The Garfield Movie. He co-wrote and produced the 10 song soundtrack album which include his works with Jon Batiste, Keith Urban, Snoop Dogg and Calum Scott.

== Early life and career ==
Born Michael E. Hodges in Little Rock, Arkansas USA, Michael began his love for music at an early age. At the age of 12 he performed his first solo concert and by 22 had his first No. 1 song. Hodges continued his music career touring, writing songs and singing background vocals for several notable bands. In 2013, he was approached by Ken Caillat and Kayla Morrison about starting a unique record label focused on film and television. In 2013 Hodges assisted in building Sleeping Giant Media, an artist friendly publishing catalog with a network of writers, artists, producers and composers credited with numerous Grammy, Emmy and Oscar nominations and awards. In 2014, Hodges assisted in the development of an integrated business model for film, television, and music and became Co-CEO of ASG Music Group, LLC (Alcon Sleeping Giant) a joint venture between Alcon Entertainment and Sleeping Giant Media.

== Discography ==
=== Films ===
Year	Title	Notes
2014	Dolphin Tale 2	
2015	Wild Horses	
2015	Point Break	
2016	No Manches Frida	
2017	Blade Runner Black Out 2022	
2017	Father Figures	
2017	Blade Runner 2049	
2019	No Manches Frida 2	
2024	The Garfield Movie	

=== Television ===
Year	Title	Notes
2015–2019	The Expanse	
2017–2019	Pete the Cat	
2021–2022	Blade Runner: Black Lotus	
2026–	Hey A.J.!	
