= Son of Merlin =

Acton-fantasy comic book miniseries

- Cover to Son of Merlin #1

Publication information
- Publisher: Top Cow Heroes and Villains Entertainment
- Schedule: Monthly
- Format: Mini Series
- Genre: Action, Fantasy, Thriller
- Publication date: February 2013
- No. of issues: 5

Creative team
- Created by: Heroes and Villains Entertainment
- Written by: Robert Place Napton
- Artist: Zid
- Letterer: Troy Peteri

Son of Merlin is a joint comic book venture of Top Cow Productions and Heroes and Villains Entertainment.

== History ==
First released in February 2013, Son of Merlin is a five issue comic book mini series written by Robert Place Napton, with art by Zid.

== Plot ==
Simon Ambrose is a brilliant young professor at MIT. Always somewhat out of sync with the rest of the world, Simon is a man of science and does not put much stock in faith. When he discovers that he is the bastard son of the world's greatest wizard Merlin, he is forced to put his skepticism aside and embrace a world of magic and the mayhem it embodies.

=== Son of Merlin #1 ===
The wizard Merlin finds human magician Gwen tied up in a New York warehouse. He uses magic to release her only to find himself trapped in a binding circle. Gwen escapes before enchantress Morgana le Fay enters and kills Merlin. She tries to retrieve Merlin's diary from his body but it vanishes. At MIT, Merlin's diary appears in Simon Ambrose's lab. Gwen later approaches him and tells Simon that Merlin is his father, but they're interrupted by Morgana's Black Knights.

=== Son of Merlin #2 ===
Gwen and Simon narrowly escape the Black Knights and flee to one of Merlin’s safe houses. Gwen trains Simon how to heal himself, use telekinesis, and shapeshift. Another Black Knight, Ywain follows them to the safe house and attacks Simon and Gwen.

=== Son of Merlin #3 ===
Simon stuns Ywain by using telekinesis long enough for him and Gwen to escape through a secret exit and trigger the self-destruct sequence. In order to get the Stone of Giramphiel before Morgana, Simon shapeshifts and sneaks into Le Fay headquarters. A barely-alive Ywain returns to Morgana and tells her of Simon’s magic powers. Simon finds out that Morgana has been searching for the stone in Istanbul. He goes with Gwen to her mother Penelope’s house for the night without realizing Morgana is watching them.

=== Son of Merlin #4 ===
Morgana attacks Gwen and Simon while they sleep. Accepting they're overpowered, Simon agrees to give her Merlin's diary in exchange for their safety. Simon and Gwen travel to Istanbul and enter a cave full of Morgana's Black Knights. Merlin's ghost appears and guides Simon towards The Stone of Giramphiel but also warns him of three elements protecting it. Simon lifts a giant rock to pass the first safeguard, but water fills the cave and Simon admits he can't swim.

=== Son of Merlin #5 ===
Simon finds an underwater passage that leads to The Stone of Giramphiel in ring form. He and Gwen fight and defeat the third element, Fire Wraiths, only for Black Knights appear. Simon puts on the ring and uses its power to escape into another realm but leaves Gwen with Morgana. He confronts her at Stonehenge and agrees to use the combined power of his ring and Merlin's diary to help Morgana summon Keres to devour all of humanity. Simon quickly betrays her by instead summoning Keres to kill Morgana. With Gwen safe, she and Simon search for the most recent incarnation of King Arthur.

== See also ==
- Top Cow Productions
- Heroes and Villains Entertainment
