= Netherworld (Top Cow) =

- Cover of Netherworld Issue #1

Publication information
- Publisher: Top Cow Heroes and Villains Entertainment
- Schedule: Monthly
- Format: mini series
- Genre: Action, Supernatural, Thriller
- Publication date: May 2011
- No. of issues: 5

Creative team
- Created by: Heroes and Villains Entertainment
- Written by: Bryan Edward Hill & Rob Levin
- Artist: Tony Shasteen
- Letterer: Troy Peteri
- Colorist(s): Dave McCaig, Lee Loughridge
- Editor: Filip Sablik

Netherworld is a joint comic book venture of Top Cow Productions and Heroes and Villains Entertainment.

== History ==
The first issue of Netherworld was released on May 11, 2011. It is a five issue comic book mini series written by Bryan Edward Hill and Rob Levin. The art is by Tony Shasteen for comics 1,2,3, and 5, and by Dennis Calero for #4.

== Plot ==
Ray Parker is a bounty hunter who just wants to do his job and be left alone, but when he's charged with finding and protecting a missing girl, he finds out that they're all souls trapped in a hellish version of Purgatory, and the girl is their last hope for escaping it.

=== Netherworld #1 ===
Release date: May 11, 2011

Bounty hunter Ray Parker is approached by a mysterious woman, Alexis, who offers him a job: finding a girl named Madeline. Later, he gets the same offer to find the same girl from Seth, a henchman of Cyrus Kane, a mob boss who allegedly has the whole city in his pocket. Ray declines both offers - saying to Alexis that he only hunts criminals and fugitives; and to Seth that he doesn't believe in Cyrus Kane's power. However, Ray is intrigued. He tracks down Madeline at the nightclub where she works. When Madeline is cornered by three thugs outside the club, Ray steps in to help. He chases two of them away; but then, the last thug transforms into something inhuman.

=== Netherworld #2 ===
Release date: June 2011

Ray incapacitates the monstrous thug and takes off with Madeline. He brings her to Alexis, demanding an explanation. Alexis gives Ray the truth: they are all dead, and the city is what used to be Purgatory. Now Kane, a demon from Hell has taken over it, and Madeline is the only one who can open the gate to Heaven and save them from an eternity of damnation. Ray must bring Madeline to the train station at the edge of the city; or all hope will be lost. Alexis gives Ray the power to see Kane's servants in their true form. Meanwhile, Cyrus Kane gathers up his henchmen and orders them to find Madeline. With Alexis' Men in White (the underground resistance group against Kane) no longer useful as they have revealed "The Gate" to him, Kane tells Seth to destroy them. It turns out that a member of the Men in White is a suicide bomber working for Kane: he blows up their hidden base, taking Alexis and every other member with him. Ray and Madeline barely escape.

=== Netherworld #3 ===
Release date: August 24, 2011

Ray, with the new power given to him by Alexis, realizes that Kane's demons are everywhere. He takes Madeline back to his apartment to get some supplies. Pursued by Kane's henchmen, Ray takes Madeline to find Stroman, his ex-dealer back when Ray was a junkie. To Ray's shock, Stroman is a demon, but he assures Ray that he wants to help. He gives Ray a map of the city. One of Kane's demons finds them; Madeline shoots him dead with Ray's gun. Ray and Madeline follow Stroman's map to where the train station should be, but find nothing. Alexis shows up, telling Madeline she's not ready to leave just yet. She explains that they are all here to redeem themselves for something wrong they've done in their previous lives. But it might be too late for all of them... as Kane's demons descend on them.

=== Netherworld #4 ===
Release date: February, 2012

Ray drives away at breakneck speeds, demons in hot pursuit. They get trapped and fight off hordes of demons until Seth arrives. Seth stabs Ray and takes Madeline. As Ray lies dying again, he begins to remember his past. He was a special agent, working undercover with bank robbers. At the very end of the robbery, Ray turns on the robbers, and one of them shoots Madeline, who was just an innocent civilian in the wrong place at the wrong time. Ray is unable to live with this guilt, and commits suicide.

=== Netherworld #5 ===
Release date: April, 2012

Ray awakens to find one of the Men in White, who supplies him with weapons and reminds him of the dangers if he doesn't get to Madeline before the train arrives. Ray storms Cane's building, guns blazing. He works his way through the demons until he comes to Seth. Ray asks Seth where Madeline is, but he won't tell Ray. They fight mano a mano, and Ray realizes that Seth was the bank robber who shot Madeline in his life on Earth. Ray kills Seth, and goes to the train station. Kane is there waiting for the train with Madeline. Ray tries to shoot him, but Kane proclaims that nothing from this realm can kill him. When the train comes, which is not from this realm, Ray pushes Kane in front of it, killing Kane. Madeline gets on the train, but Ray decides to stay in purgatory to help other good people get to the train.

== Cast of Characters ==
- Ray Parker
- Madeline
- Cyrus Kane
- Seth
- Alexis
- The Men in White
- Cyrus Kane

== See also ==
Top Cow Productions

Heroes and Villains Entertainment
