= Monster War =

Monster War may refer to:

- "Monster Wars", episodes 12–14 of the first season of Godzilla: The Series (1999)

== Literature ==
- Monster War, a 2005 intercompany crossover comic book limited series published by Image Comics (through its Top Cow imprint) and Dynamite Entertainment
- Nightmare Academy: Monster War, a 2009 novel by Dean Lorey, the third installment in the Nightmare Academy trilogy
- The Monster War: A Tale of the King's Blades, a 2010 omnibus of a trilogy of novels by Dave Duncan
- The Monster War: A League of Seven Novel, a 2016 novel by Alan Gratz, the third installment in the League of Seven trilogy

== Video gaming ==
- Godzilla: The Series - Monster Wars, a 2000 Game Boy Color video game based on the TV series
- Monster War Online, an online game developed by Oscar Chu

== See also ==
- Great Monster War (怪獣大戦争, Kaijū Dai-sensō), the Japanese alternative title of the 1965 Toho kaiju film Invasion of Astro-Monster
- Monster Warriors, a 2006–2008 Canadian television series
- War of the Monsters, the American alternative title of the 1966 Japanese kaiju film Gamera vs. Barugon
- War of the Monsters, a 2003 fighting video game
