= Craig Clark =

American animator and musician (born 1960)

Craig Clark (born 1960 in Santa Monica, California) and raised in Malibu, California, is an American animator, an art rock, darkwave musician (Chorus of Souls on Fluxus Records), a comic book artist (Nemesister and Astrothrill), and an album cover artist (The Nymphs on Geffen Records).

== Biography ==
Clark began his career as a child actor at the age of 8, when he starred in an educational film called "Forgive and Forget" directed by voice actor Shep Menken in 1968. Switching to animation at age 14, he was discovered by animators Corny Cole (Looney Tunes) and Duane Crowther (Yellow Submarine), and was mentored by longtime Disney animator Amby Paliwoda (Snow White and the Seven Dwarfs)at Duck Soup Producktions. Clark was one of the original animation and layout artists on the first three seasons of The Simpsons at Klasky Csupo, and has gone on to animate on various other animated projects such as several Peanuts TV specials for Bill Melendez productions, and many special effects feature films, such as Forrest Gump, The Mask, Godzilla, An American Tail: Fievel Goes West, Big Trouble in Little China, Cool World, Bill and Ted's Excellent Adventure , Mortal Kombat (1995 film) and Poltergeist II: The Other Side.

Clark has produced and directed The Kustomonsters animated show for the web and TV through Cheeky Entertainment, and has aired on AMGTV in U.S. syndication and also streaming TV service OSI74 Roku. Clark also released three Kustomonsters feature films currently running on Tubi, Amazon Prime, OSI74 Roku, and more. A fourth Kustomonsters movie is in production called Kustomonsters 4; Bikini Wars.

== Filmography ==
Filmography
Year	Work	Role	Notes
1983	Automan	special effects animator	ABC TV series
1984	The Philadelphia Experiment; A Nightmare on Elm Street	special effects animator uncredited storyboard artist	Theatrical Movie; Theatrical Movie
1985	My Science Project; Misfits of Science; Starchaser: The Legend of Orin	special effects animator special effects director computer graphics planner	Theatrical Movie; NBC TV series Theatrical Movie
1986	Poltergeist II: The Other Side; Solarbabies; Big Trouble in Little China; Slimer! Kissyfur	special effects assistant special effects animator special effects animator assistant animator assistant animator	Theatrical Movie; Theatrical Movie; Theatrical Movie; ABC TV series NBC TV series
1987	A Nightmare on Elm Street 3: Dream Warriors; My Demon Lover	special effects animator	Theatrical Movie; Theatrical Movie
1988	Hobgoblins; This Is America, Charlie Brown; Garfield's Babes and Bullets	rotoscope artist animator animator	Theatrical Movie; CBS TV series CBS TV Short
1989	Bill and Ted's Excellent Adventure; Cathy's Valentine	special effects animator animator	Theatrical Movie; CBS TV Short
1990	The Simpsons; Hollywood Dog	animator & character layout rotoscope artist	Fox TV series Fox TV movie
1991	Little Dracula; An American Tail: Fievel Goes West	storyboard artist special effects animator	Fox Kids TV series Theatrical Movie
1992	Rugrats; Cool World; Frosty Returns; P.J. Sparkles	storyboard revisions effects animator animator storyboard artist	Nickelodeon TV series Theatrical Movie; TV short TV short
1993	Rocko's Modern Life; Freaked<br>Knott's Mystery Lodge; Honey, I Shrunk the Audience! Demolition Man; Addams Family Values	storyboard artist animator special effects animator special effects animator special effects animator special effects animator	Nickelodeon TV series Theatrical Movie; Knott's Berry Farm attraction Disneyland attraction Theatrical Movie; Theatrical Movie
1994	Forrest Gump; The Mask	Digital animator Digital roto & paint	Theatrical Movie; Theatrical Movie
1995	Mortal Kombat; Mortal Kombat: The Journey Begins	Digital animator 3D animation artist	Theatrical Movie; Direct-to-video Movie
1996	Goosebumps: Escape from Horrorland	Digital artist	Video game
1997	Nemesister; The Lost World: Jurassic Park	Comic artist 3D pre-viz	Comic Book; Video Game
1998	Godzilla; The Visitor	Technical director FX Animator	Theatrical Movie; Fox TV series
1999–2000	Mission Hill	Prop design supervisor	The WB/Adult Swim TV series
2001	The Oblongs	Prop design supervisor	The WB/Adult Swim TV series
2002	Lil' Pimp	storyboard artist	Theatrical Movie
2003	VH1 ILL-ustrated; I Want a Dog for Christmas, Charlie Brown	character artist assistant animator	VH1 TV series ABC TV Short
2004	LeapFrog: Talking Words Factory II - Code Word Caper; Hi Hi Puffy AmiYumi	Storyboard Artist; Digital Artist	Direct-to-video movie Cartoon Network TV series
2005	[The Origin of Stitch; Astrothrill	Digital Coloring; Director	Video Short; Video Short
2006	The Adventures of Chico and Guapo	Layout artist	MTV2 TV series
2007	Slacker Cats; The Off Mikes; Bufu	animator animator animator	ABC Family TV series ESPN.com web shorts BET web shorts
2008	LeapFrog: Sing and Learn with Us! Spaceballs: The Animated Series	animator animator	Direct-to-video Movie; G4 TV series
2009	Dixie Dynamite	animator	Theatrical Movie
2010	Sule and the Case of the Tiny Sparks; Bunraku; The Kustomonsters	animator visual effects Director / Creator	TV Short; Theatrical Movie; AMGTV TV Series
2011	Woodstock Manor	Director	TV Short
2012	Christmas in the Trenches; Chloe's Closet	Director; Storyboard Artist	TV Short; PBS Kids Sprout TV series
2013	Baby Owl; Lucky Penny	Animation Support; Director	TV Short; TV Short
2014	Rainbow Brite; Stick Together; Cacophony; Timbuktu	Art Director / Development; Animator; Director; Director	Feeln TV series TV Short; TV Short; TV Short
2015	The Kustomonsters Movie	Writer/Director	TV movie
2016	The Kustomonsters	Director/ Creator	AMGTV TV series
2017	Nemesister: Rio Underground	Director	TV Short
2018	Let's Go Luna!	Storyboard Artist	PBS TV series
2018-2019	The Kustomonsters	Director/ Creator	OSI74 TV series
2020	Kustomonsters 2	Writer/Director	TV movie
2021	From Slave to Queen; Nemesister: Nem a Go Go	Guest Animator; Director	TV Short; TV Short
2023	Kustomonsters 3	Writer/Director	TV movie
2024	Bewitched MGC	Director	TV/ Web pilot
2025	Kustomonsters 4	Writer/Director	TV movie
2026	Hey A.J.!	Director	Disney Junior TV series

== Published works ==
- Nemesister (1997) (Cheeky Press)
- Astrothrill (1999) (comicbook/CD) (Fluxus Records)

ISBN 1-929197-00-4 and ISBN 978-1-929197-00-2
