= Widows (soundtrack) =

Widows (Original Motion Picture Soundtrack)

Soundtrack album by Hans Zimmer
- Released: November 16, 2018
- Recorded: 2018
- Genres: Film score; film soundtrack
- Length: 36:45
- Label: Milan
- Producer: Hans Zimmer

Hans Zimmer chronology
Blade Runner 2049 (2017)	Widows (2018)	Dark Phoenix (2019)

Singles from Widows (Original Motion Picture Soundtrack)
- 1. "The Big Unknown" Released: November 9, 2018

Widows (Original Motion Picture Soundtrack) is the soundtrack album to the 2018 film Widows directed by Steve McQueen. The film's original score is composed by Hans Zimmer, and the album featured eight tracks of Zimmer's score and three songs; one of them "The Big Unknown" by Sade was released as a single on November 9, 2018. The soundtrack was released through Milan Records on November 16.

== Development ==
"I have a weird history with Widows because I worked for Stanley Myers, who was the composer on Widows the television series. I was the T-boy on it. This was in the '80s, and at that time this was an important subject, and it was great television. It just sort of showed that casual cruelty women are subjected to constantly, and I thought it was an important piece of television that would make noise and make people think. And when Steve started to talk to me about projects he was thinking of doing and Widows was one of those ideas, I suddenly realized that after all these years, if anything the world has gotten worse. It was as relevant then as it is now, and that was a bit infuriating in a way. It's a bit sad that humanity is so bad at becoming kinder."

— Hans Zimmer

Hans Zimmer composed the score for Widows renewing his association with Steve McQueen on 12 Years a Slave (2013). Zimmer had assisted Stanley Myers, the composer who scored the 1983 British television crime drama series on which the film is based on, and thought about the "revolutionary bit of storytelling" at that time on the brutality against women, and the series would "change the way we treat women"; when McQueen narrated the story for the film, he immediately approved it because "things had not gotten better."

Zimmer, though not revisiting Myers' score, partly influenced his work subconsciously and provided his original ideas while composing music. He adopted McQueen's idea of thinking the film as a painting where the brush stroke goes right off the canvas—which he told when Zimmer was scoring 12 Years a Slave—and went ahead with this mentality while composing Widows.

Zimmer recorded Widows' score at the old church in London; he had an affinity for this venue, because it had a "beautiful, epic sound" but found it inappropriate to compose a lush score. He renewed his association with all of his norm musicians—bassist Andy Pask, percussionist Luis Jardim and keyboardist Steve Mazzaro—and putting them into a "far drier, far less glamorous, far less flamboyant sort of setting", completely opposite of the church's atmosphere. They relied heavily on prepared piano, using strings inside the piano, bass as percussions to make unique acoustic sounds. He added a minimal string ensemble which was recorded in a small studio to maintain an acidic quality. Strings were another primary element of the score, which he wanted to be "beautiful, but not sentimental, and not cloying, and certainly not grand."

Zimmer closely associated with editor Joe Walker as he also had minimal experience of using sounds and intertwining into the edit. He found the editing and sound being important as the performances. Zimmer compliment his work, saying "Joe uses sound in brilliant ways to transition from one shot to the next, so the last thing I wanted to do was go and disturb that. There's a whole other piece of music flowing through the movie that is Joe Walker's edits." Steve Mazzaro provided additional music.

== Release ==
The soundtrack was released through Milan Records on November 16, 2018, the same day as the film. The album features three original songs—"Wild is the Wind" by Nina Simone, "Dice Game" by The Cool Kids and "The Big Unknown" by Sade. The latter of which was released as a single on November 9, 2018.

== Track listing ==
No.	Title	Artist(s)	Length
1.	"Marcus"		3:24
2.	"We Have a Job to Do"		2:33
3.	"Money"		2:34
4.	"Perimeter Check"		3:09
5.	"The Calm Before the Storm"		1:39
6.	"The Job"		4:58
7.	"Race Against Time"		1:23
8.	"My Son"		2:33
9.	"Wild Is the Wind"	Nina Simone	7:00
10.	"Dice Game"	The Cool Kids	3:11
11.	"The Big Unknown"	Sade	4:21
Total length:			36:45

== Reception ==
Kaya Savas of Film.Music.Media wrote "The score has two simple functions here, add emotion without being melodic and add tension without being emotional. This is a sound design score done with precise execution. It's short and doesn't do anything else it doesn't need to. McQueen leaves the heavy lifting to the way he shoots, and the power of the performances. Widows includes many long takes that just linger on a face, as you watch emotion build and erupt through the performance alone. If you've seen movies like Hunger, Shame and 12 Years A Slave then you know the type of film to expect. While it may seem like a waste of talent to put Hans to work on just simple structural builds, it ends up adding a sonic identity that only Hans's sound could bring." Negatively, Filmtracks wrote "the album is thus a total dud of an experience, Zimmer's choice to withhold any meaningful emotional depth yielding a useless and brief distraction."

Mark Kermode of The Guardian wrote "Hans Zimmer's low-key score is used sparsely at first, subtly emphasising themes of loneliness while making way for the vinyl sounds of Nina Simone's Wild Is the Wind". Adam Chitwood of Collider noted that Zimmer's score "flies a little under the radar for a bit, but when it kicks into high gear it's tremendously effective." Chris Bumbray of JoBlo.com called it "one of Hans Zimmer's better recent scores". Chris Evangelista of /Film called it as a "churning, ominous score". Barry Hertz of The Globe and Mail stated "the score by Hans Zimmer avoids all the worst of Zimmer's usual bombastic trappings". Calling it "intense" and "effective", Sandy Schaefer of Screen Rant further noted that the score was further reminiscent of his "propulsive score for The Dark Knight (2008)." Anne Cohen of Refinery29 mentioned the score "thrumming".

Bilge Ebiri of Vulture mentioned it as one of the best film scores of 2018, adding "[Zimmer is] actually one of the most versatile composers of our time, and his work can be delicate and sad just as often as it can be big, brassy, and thunderous. The moods he conjures for Steve McQueen's emotional heist drama are gorgeous and complex — luxuriating in jazzy fields of melancholy with undercurrents of unease, as if to hint at the characters' unresolved grief and anger."

== Awards and nominations ==
Organisation	Category	Recipient(s)	Result
Hollywood Music in Media Awards	Best Original Score – Feature Film	Hans Zimmer	Nominated
Satellite Awards	Best Original Score	Hans Zimmer	Nominated
Washington D.C. Area Film Critics Association	Best Score	Hans Zimmer	Nominated
