= Dark Phoenix (soundtrack) =

2019 film score by Hans Zimmer

Dark Phoenix (Original Motion Picture Soundtrack)

Film score by Hans Zimmer
- Released: June 7, 2019
- Recorded: 2018–2019
- Genre: Film score
- Length: 1:07:55
- Label: Fox Music
- Director: Hans Zimmer

Hans Zimmer chronology
Widows (2018)	Dark Phoenix (2019)	The Lion King (2019)

Dark Phoenix (Original Motion Picture Soundtrack) is the soundtrack album to the 2019 film of the same name, based on the Marvel Comics X-Men characters. It is a sequel to X-Men: Apocalypse (2016) the seventh and final mainline installment in the X-Men film series, and the twelfth installment overall. Directed by Simon Kinberg, the film's musical score is composed by Hans Zimmer; his first superhero film he scored after Batman v Superman: Dawn of Justice (2016). The soundtrack album was released alongside the film on June 7, 2019, by Fox Music. The score received a mixed critical response. A second album titled Xperiments From Dark Phoenix released in that August, containing unreleased music from the film, which garnered generally favorable response.

== Background ==
Despite Zimmer having said in March 2016 that he would not score another superhero film following his experience working on Batman v Superman: Dawn of Justice (2016), Evan Peters who played Quicksilver in the franchise had stated that Zimmer would compose for the film in Josh Horowitz's podcast in January 2018. Zimmer in September 2018, explained that conversations with director Ron Howard had convinced him to not keep to a "blanket" view and avoid an entire genre, instead focusing on waiting for the right story. When Kinberg approached him at a concert to talk about his vision for Dark Phoenix, Zimmer realized that the story was one he wanted to help tell and that the film was an opportunity for something that he had always wanted to try in a film score, so he decided to join the production. In writing the film's score, Zimmer wrote new themes for the X-Men, Magneto, Phoenix, and chose to omit previously established themes written by previous composer John Ottman.

== Track listing ==
Dark Phoenix: Original Motion Picture Soundtrack
No.	Title	Length
1.	"Gap"	8:07
2.	"Dark"	4:27
3.	"Frameshift"	8:15
4.	"Amity"	5:52
5.	"Intimate"	10:14
6.	"Negative"	3:58
7.	"Deletion"	4:51
8.	"Reckless"	9:35
9.	"Insertion"	7:56
10.	"Coda"	4:40
Total length:		67:55

== Xperiments from Dark Phoenix ==
Xperiments from Dark Phoenix

Film score by Hans Zimmer
- Released: August 5, 2019
- Recorded: 2018–2019
- Genre: Film score
- Length: 1:18:43
- Labels: Remote Control Productions; Fox Music
- Director: Hans Zimmer

A second album, entitled Xperiments from Dark Phoenix, was announced on July 25. This soundtrack featured previously unreleased suites and themes for the film, intended to be released as the second disk of a two-CD set, along with the soundtrack. When it appeared the material would not be released, a fan-led petition to Fox Music was made to release the album. Zimmer later revealed in an interview with Mark Kermode on Scala Radio, saying that over 16 hours of music was written for the film and that he was fighting to get a second disk released after the critical and financial failure of the film. Later, Fox Music released the album digitally on August 5, 2019. Zanobard Reviews called it as "a welcome expansion on the themes and compositional style of his original Dark Phoenix score", whereas Filmtracks.com wrote "even those most ardent Zimmer skeptics can assemble a viable suite of the composer's easy-listening anthemic mode from the two albums".

No.	Title	Length
1.	"X-HZT"	17:27
2.	"X-X"	5:59
3.	"X-LGDP"	8:07
4.	"X-SI"	6:25
5.	"X-HD"	3:32
6.	"X-MP"	3:21
7.	"X-MT"	5:03
8.	"X-TX"	8:48
9.	"X-MDP"	9:06
10.	"X-F"	3:56
11.	"X-CH"	4:58
12.	"X-SS"	2:01
Total length:		78:43

== Reception ==
The soundtrack met with a mixed response from critics. Zanobard Reviews wrote that "Hans Zimmer's score to X-Men: Dark Phoenix is a rather bizarre one. For a start, it isn't really a superhero score, at least not in a traditional sense; it's very dark; being quite atmospheric and near haunting at points, and while I'd say that tone works very well for the Dark Phoenix theme (easily the standout composition of the score) it doesn't work at all for the severely underused X-Men motif. It's a bold and dramatic piece, but listening to it I get no real sense of heroism or even just hope, and that's not good for a superhero theme [...] The album spends most of its runtime building up (both tonally and thematically) to something, but there's basically no release for it. That build-up never amounts to anything; the album just kind of stops at the end, leaving you feeling kind of underwhelmed at the whole experience. The two main themes never really get the full thematic workout that one was hoping for." James Southall of Movie Wave wrote "Dark Phoenix is a decent enough atmosphere piece, but nothing much more – unless you're a really big fan of Zimmer's modern, darker sound". Soundtrack World called the score as Zimmer's weakest to date.

== Charts ==
Dark Phoenix (Original Motion Picture Soundtrack)
Chart (2019)	Peak position
UK Album Downloads (OCC)	53
UK Soundtrack Albums (OCC)	19

== Accolades ==
Zimmer was nominated for Best Original Score in a Sci-Fi/Fantasy Film at the 10th Hollywood Music in Media Awards, but lost to Alan Silvestri for his score in Avengers: Endgame (2019).
