= Martellus Bennett =

American football player (born 1987)

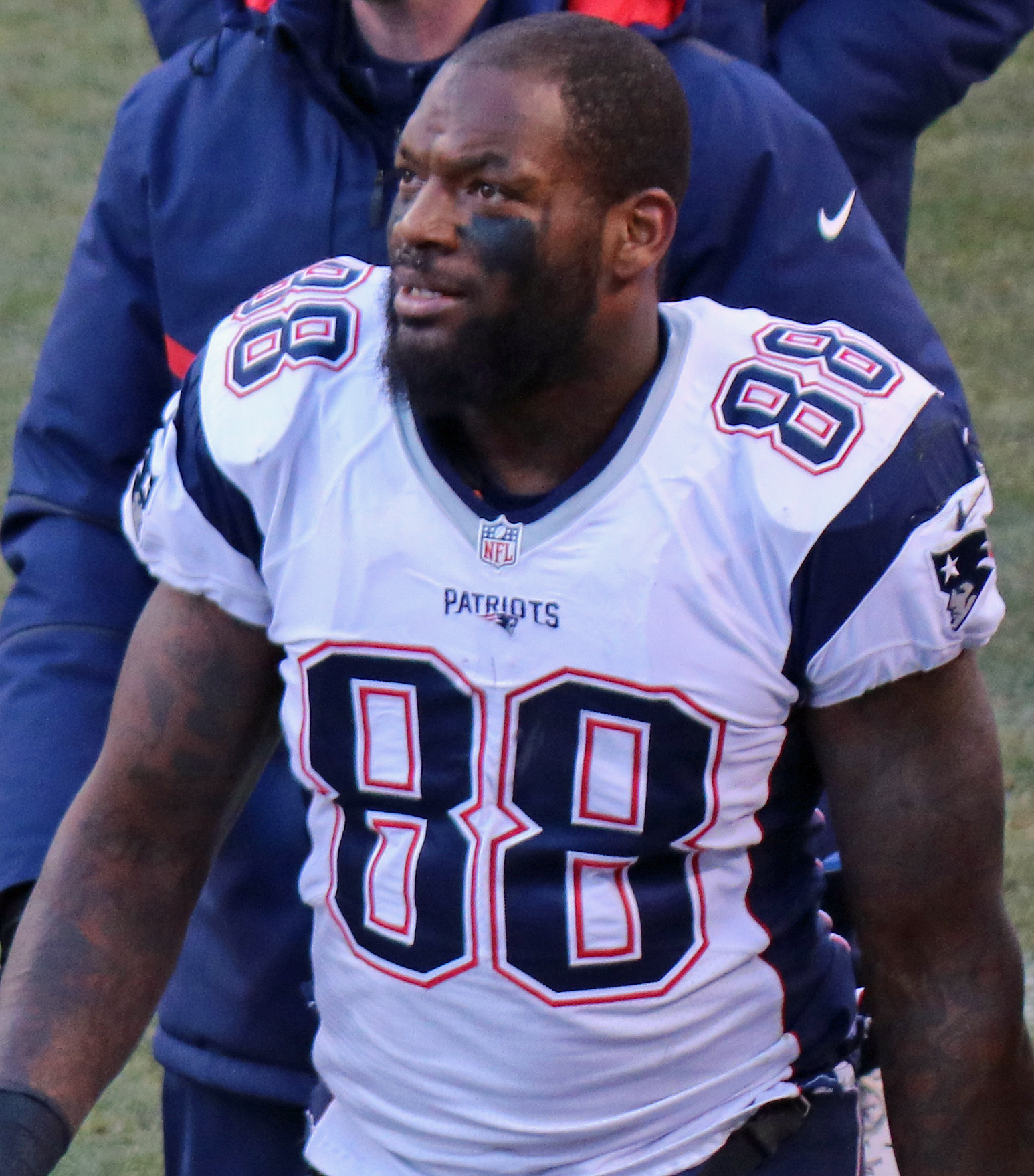
- Bennett with the New England Patriots in 2016

No. 80, 85, 83, 88
- Position: Tight end

Personal information
- Born: March 10, 1987 (age 39); Houston, Texas, U.S.
- Listed height: 6 ft 6 in (1.98 m)
- Listed weight: 275 lb (125 kg)

Career information
- High school: Alief Taylor (Houston)
- College: Texas A&M (2005–2007)
- NFL draft: 2008: 2nd round, 61st overall pick

Career history
- Dallas Cowboys (2008–2011); New York Giants (2012); Chicago Bears (2013–2015); New England Patriots (2016); Green Bay Packers (2017); New England Patriots (2017)

Awards and highlights
- Super Bowl champion (LI); Pro Bowl (2014); Second-team All-Big 12 (2006)

Career NFL statistics
- Receptions: 433
- Receiving yards: 4,573
- Receiving touchdowns: 30
- Stats at Pro Football Reference

Martellus Demond Bennett (born March 10, 1987) is an American children's author and former professional football tight end who played in the National Football League (NFL) for 10 seasons. Bennett played college football for the Texas A&M Aggies, receiving second-team All-Big 12 in 2006. He was selected by the Dallas Cowboys in the second round of the 2008 NFL draft. Bennett was a member of five teams during his career, most notably the Chicago Bears, where he earned Pro Bowl honors, and the New England Patriots, where he won Super Bowl LI. After retiring, Bennett became a children's author and published books under his publication company The Imagination Agency. He is the younger brother of former defensive end Michael Bennett.

== Early life ==
Martellus Bennett played football and basketball at Alief Taylor High School in Houston, Texas. He was a three-year starter and two-time All-District and All-Greater Houston selection at tight end. As a sophomore, Bennett averaged 12.4 yards per catch. As a junior, he caught 13 passes for 170 yards and two touchdowns. As a senior, Bennett had a team-high of 42 receptions for 487 yards and six touchdowns, earning first-team Class 5A all-state honors from the Texas Sports Writers Association. He also averaged 23 points and 8.2 rebounds per game as a senior in basketball. Bennett played in the 2005 U.S. Army All-American Bowl.

As a college football prospect in his senior year of high school, Bennett was a five-star recruit, ranked by Rivals.com as the No. 1 tight end and No. 8 best player in the 2005 prospect class. He was recruited by Texas A&M, Duke, Kansas, LSU, Miami, Oklahoma, and Texas. Although Bennett originally committed to play for Miami, he chose to sign a National Letter of Intent to play for Texas A&M.

Bennett also had interest in playing professional basketball, so he decided to declare for the 2005 NBA draft after his senior season. Bennett did not hire an agent though, intending to go to college if he was not selected in the first round. NBA scouts informed Bennett that it was unlikely he would, causing him to withdraw from the draft a few days prior. As a result, Bennett decided to enroll in classes in the second summer session at Texas A&M.

== College career ==
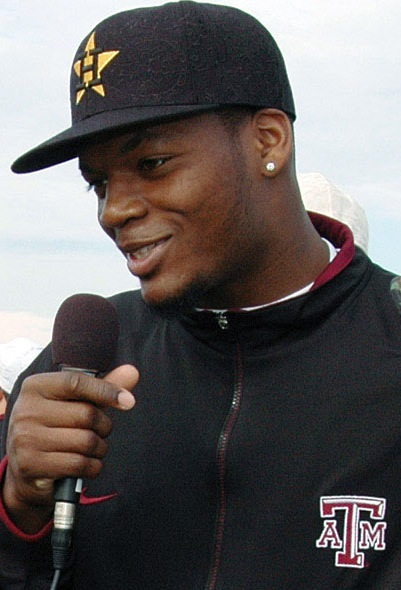
Bennett on the USS Bonhomme Richard (LHD-6) during the 2006 Holiday Bowl luncheon

As a freshman at Texas A&M University, Bennett caught 18 passes for 162 yards and three touchdowns.

As a sophomore, Bennett was named one of eight semifinalists for the John Mackey Award, given annually to the nation's top tight end, after making 38 catches for 497 yards and three touchdowns. On October 28, 2006, he caught a career-high of 133 yards and two touchdowns on five catches against Baylor. Bennett was named the Mackey Award Player of the Week after the game. He finished the season with All-Big 12 Second-team honors.

As a junior, Bennett had 49 receptions for 587 yards and four touchdowns. After the season, an NFL committee indicated to Bennett that he would be a first or second-round pick in the NFL draft, so Bennett decided to skip his senior season and declare early for the draft.

In his three seasons at Texas A&M University, Bennett caught 105 passes for 1,246 yards and 10 touchdowns. His 105 receptions equal the school record of most receptions by a tight end. Bennett only averaged 34.6 yards per game, though many felt that his head coach, Dennis Franchione, who ran a run-oriented offense, did not properly use his talent. After his sophomore season, Bennett recorded a rap song called "Throw Me The Ball, Coach," and made a remix with his teammates. He played with his brother, Michael, at Texas A&M from 2006 to 2008.

Bennett also played basketball for Texas A&M for two seasons under head coach Billy Gillispie, but decided to focus on football in January 2007. In the 2005–06 season, his first, Bennett became the first Texas A&M athlete since 1969 to letter in both basketball and football. He played in 26 games his freshman season, averaging 1.9 points and 1.5 rebounds. As a sophomore, before choosing football, Bennett averaged 0.5 points and 0.5 rebounds.

== Professional career ==
=== Pre-draft ===
Pre-draft measurables
Height	Weight	Arm length	Hand span	40-yard dash	10-yard split	20-yard split	20-yard shuttle	Three-cone drill	Vertical jump	Broad jump	Bench press
6 ft 6 1/8 in (1.98 m)	259 lb (117 kg)	35 in (0.89 m)	9 5/8 in (0.24 m)	4.68 s	1.53 s	2.67 s	4.53 s	7.64 s	34.0 in (0.86 m)	9 ft 10 in (3.00 m)	18 reps
All values from NFL Combine

At the 2008 NFL Scouting Combine, Bennett finished the 40-yard dash in 4.68 seconds, ranking seventh out of the eight tight ends in his group. Bennett ranked third in the vertical jump (34 inches) and fifth in the broad jump (9–9). Along with 30 other prospects, he was invited to the Dallas Cowboys' Valley Ranch headquarters for a predraft visit on April 17–18, 2008.

A week prior to the draft, an Associated Press sportswriter critiqued Bennett's playing abilities as: "Played basketball for the Aggies as well, and has the athletic ability to be a nice red-zone target. Lack of speed means he's not a deep threat, but once he improves his routes, his strength and size should make him an asset. Needs to improve zone recognition, too. Good, aggressive blocker."

=== Dallas Cowboys ===
==== 2008 season ====
After trading former second-round draft choice Anthony Fasano, the Cowboys selected Bennett in the second round (61st overall) of the 2008 NFL draft. According to Cowboys' owner Jerry Jones, Bennett was selected not because they needed a backup tight end, but to "add a new dimension" by being part of a two-tight-end offense. In the 2008 preseason, Bennett learned technique from tight end Jason Witten. During the preseason camps, the documentary series Hard Knocks initially portrayed Martellus as a lazy and unmotivated player. Although Bennett was initially having trouble learning the Cowboys' offense, he worked hard to improve, as later episodes of Hard Knocks showed.

Bennett agreed to a four-year contract with the team on July 24. He was given the number-two tight end position over Tony Curtis. In Week 7 against the St. Louis Rams, Bennett recorded his first career touchdown on a 34-yard pass from Brad Johnson. Bennett finished his rookie season with 20 receptions for 283 yards and four touchdowns in 16 games and seven starts.

==== 2009 season ====
Before the start of his second season, the Cincinnati Bengals offered a trade package for Bennett, but the Cowboys declined. In 2009, Bennett regressed as a receiver, compiling only 15 receptions for 159 yards in 14 games and six starts.

==== 2010 season ====
In a January 2010 news conference following the season, Jerry Jones indicated that while Bennett had breakout potential, he needed to put in the focus to meet it. Still, it was a concern that Bennett was being pushed in preseason for the backup job by John Phillips, until Phillips was lost for the season with an ACL tear. Bennett finished the 2010 season for a then career-high 33 receptions for 260 yards in 16 games and 11 starts.

==== 2011 season ====
During his time with the Cowboys, he sometimes brought attention to himself by making controversial quotes and YouTube videos. Raising some eyebrows with his "Black Olympics" video or his radio interview, where he stated that backup quarterback Jon Kitna deserved a chance to compete for the starting job, after filling in for the injured Tony Romo during the 2010 season. Bennett had an injury-plagued preseason in 2011, with an injured hamstring and right high ankle strain, keeping him out of two of four preseason games and two regular-season games, finishing the season with 17 receptions for 144 yards and no touchdowns in 14 games and seven starts.

Although Bennett could never realize his playmaking potential as the second-string tight end behind Witten, he did develop as an excellent blocker. Before the start of the 2012 season, the Cowboys offered a similar free agent deal as the one Bennett received from the New York Giants, but he decided to leave Dallas to have the opportunity to start.

=== New York Giants ===
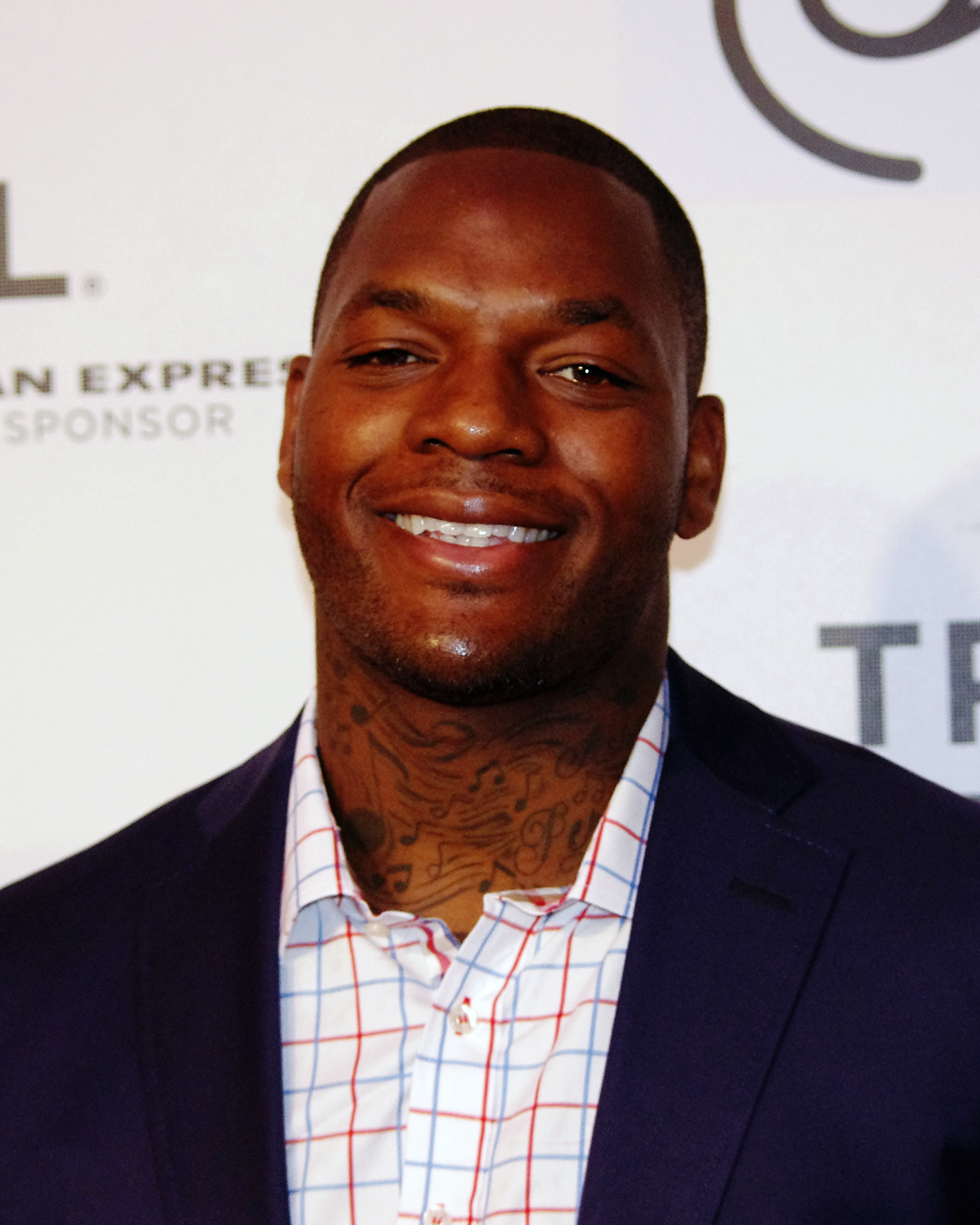
Bennett in 2012

On March 14, 2012, Bennett signed a one-year, $2.5 million contract with the Giants. After his weight ballooned to 295 pounds in the off season, when asked about his conditioning during an interview, Bennett responded: "I'm stronger than I've ever been, I'm faster than I've ever been. I could run all day. I'm kind of like a black unicorn out there". In the regular season, he got his weight under control. In the season opener against the Cowboys, his former team, Bennett recorded his first touchdown in several years. Bennett recorded 55 receptions for 626 yards and five touchdowns in 16 games and starts, while playing through different injuries.

=== Chicago Bears ===
==== 2013 season ====
On March 12, 2013, Bennett signed a four-year deal with the Chicago Bears. In Week 2, against the Minnesota Vikings, Bennett recorded his first career multi-touchdown game in the 31–30 victory. He finished the 2013 season with a career-high 65 receptions and 759 yards and five touchdowns in 16 games and 15 starts. The 65 receptions were tied for eighth in the league among tight ends, and the second-highest in team history, behind Mike Ditka's 75 in 1964. The 759 yards were tied for ninth in yards, while Bennett also tied for 12th in touchdowns among tight ends.

==== 2014 season ====
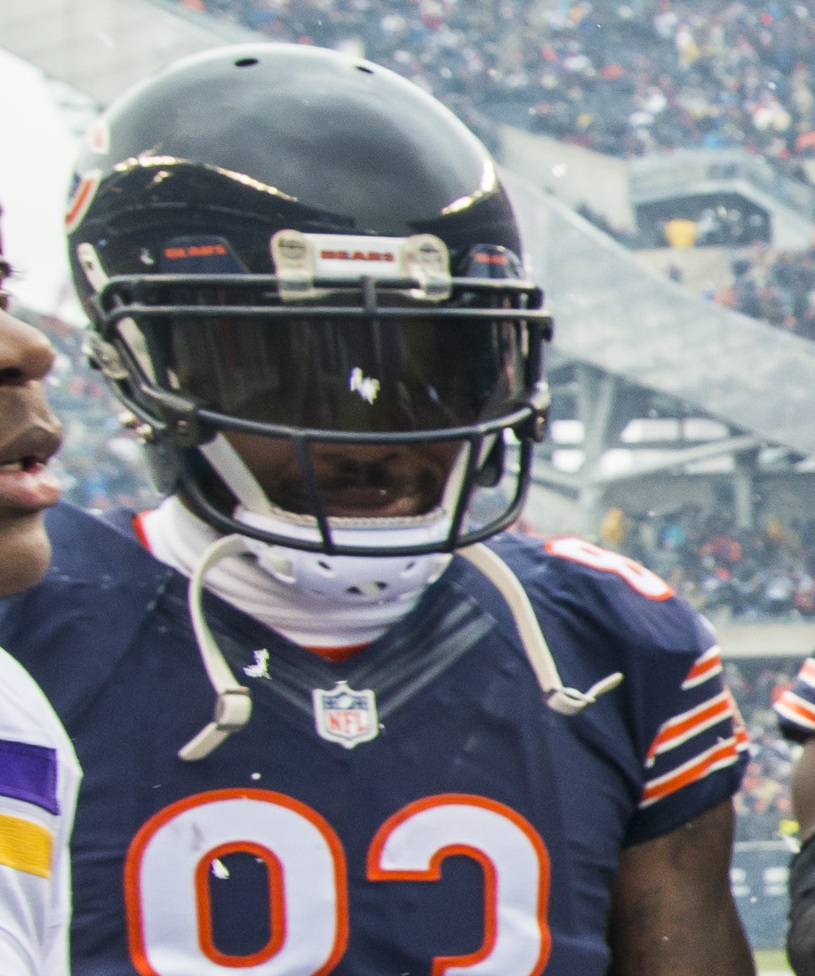
Bennett in 2014

On August 5, Bennett was suspended by the team after slamming teammate Kyle Fuller to the ground after Fuller had violently grabbed him by the helmet. Bennett was reinstated on August 10. In Week 4, against the Green Bay Packers, he recorded a career-high 134 yards in the 38–17 loss. In Week 14 against the Dallas Cowboys, Bennett recorded his 77th catch of the year, surpassing Mike Ditka for the most receptions by a tight end in Bears history. In the same game, Bennett recorded a career-high 12 receptions for 84 yards and a touchdown.

Bennett finished the season with 90 receptions for 916 yards and six touchdowns in 16 games and 15 starts. On January 19, 2015, he was named to the 2015 Pro Bowl, replacing New England Patriots tight end Rob Gronkowski.

==== 2015 season ====
Bennett held out during the team's voluntary offseason program over a contract dispute, but reported to minicamp to avoid potential fines.

On November 22, Bennett injured his ribs during Week 11 against the Denver Broncos. Bennett was "limited" in practice two days later. On November 25, the Bears announced that he was ruled out of the Week 12 matchup against the Green Bay Packers. Bennett returned to action in the overtime loss to the San Francisco 49ers, but had to leave the field after taking a hit in the third quarter and aggravating the injury, before returning to finish the game. On December 9, he was placed on the injured reserve list. At the time, Bennett was leading the team with 53 receptions, but only had 439 receiving yards (ranking third on the team).

Bennett's relationship with his teammates, coaches, and general manager deteriorated through the 2015 season. Bennett voiced displeasure about his tenure with the Bears. Bennett openly criticized Jay Cutler's on-field play in an interview with ESPN The Magazine, claiming "I'd be open and he'd throw into double coverage". Bennett later derided his ex-teammates' morale and work ethic by calling them "a bunch of bitches" in an interview with E:60.

Adam Gase, Bennett's former offensive coordinator in Chicago, described coaching him, "The challenges Marty always brought for me was he's very intelligent, and he asks a lot of very good questions."

=== New England Patriots (first stint) ===
On March 16, 2016, Bennett was traded along with a sixth-round draft pick (#204-Jordan Lucas) in the 2016 NFL draft to the New England Patriots in exchange for a fourth-round pick (#127-Deiondre' Hall) in the 2016 NFL draft . It was reported in the media that the Patriots were trying to recreate the success they experienced with the two-tight end offense that employed the Rob Gronkowski–Aaron Hernandez tandem in 2011 and 2012.

In his first five weeks, Bennett was the most efficient Patriots receiver on the field with 21 receptions for 314 yards and four touchdowns, including a three-touchdown effort in Tom Brady's return in Week 5 against the Cleveland Browns.

After Gronkowski was placed on the injured reserve list in early December, Bennett became the Patriots No. 1 tight end. He finished the regular season playing in all 16 games with 12 starts recording 55 receptions for 701 yards and a career-high seven touchdowns. His 397 yards after the catch ranked No. 2 among NFL tight ends in 2016. During the season, he was forced to play hurt, while battling ankle and shoulder injuries, which required him to undergo offseason ankle surgery to repair a cracked bone.

In the Patriots' Divisional Round win over the Houston Texans, Bennett injured his left knee in the fourth quarter, which would be another injury he would have to wait to deal with until the end of the playoffs. During Super Bowl LI, Bennett recorded five receptions for 62 yards as the Patriots defeated the Atlanta Falcons by a score of 34–28 in overtime. In overtime, he drew a pass interference penalty in the end zone, giving the Patriots the ball at the two-yard line, setting up James White's touchdown run two plays later. The Patriots had trailed 28–3 in the third quarter, but rallied to win the game. The game marked the first overtime and the largest comeback in Super Bowl history.

=== Green Bay Packers ===
On March 10, 2017, Bennett signed with the Green Bay Packers on a three-year, $21 million contract after the team was unable to reach an agreement with Jared Cook, who left for the Oakland Raiders.

In his Packers debut, Bennett had three receptions for 43 yards in a 17–9 victory over the Seattle Seahawks. He was waived by the Packers on November 8, citing a failure to disclose a medical condition designation.

=== New England Patriots (second stint) ===
On November 9, 2017, Bennett was claimed off waivers by the Patriots. The next day, it was revealed that he was diagnosed with tears in both the rotator cuff and labrum in his shoulder, requiring Bennett to undergo a physical before he could legitimately join the team. On November 27, the Patriots placed Bennett on injured reserve due to shoulder and hamstring injuries. The Patriots reached Super Bowl LII, but lost 41–33 to the Philadelphia Eagles.

On March 7, 2018, Bennett was released by the Patriots.

=== Retirement ===
On March 23, 2018, Bennett announced his retirement from the NFL to focus on his multimedia production company.

== NFL career statistics ==
Legend
	Won the Super Bowl
**Bold**	Career high

=== Regular season ===
Year	Team	GP	GS	Receiving					Fumbles	
Year	Team	GP	GS	Rec	Yds	Avg	Lng	TD	Fum	Lost
2008	DAL	**16**	7	20	283	**14.2**	37	4	0	0
2009	DAL	14	6	15	159	10.6	21	0	0	0
2010	DAL	**16**	11	33	260	7.9	32	0	1	0
2011	DAL	14	7	17	144	8.5	15	0	0	0
2012	NYG	**16**	**16**	55	626	11.4	33	5	0	0
2013	CHI	**16**	15	65	759	11.7	43	5	1	**1**
2014	CHI	**16**	15	**90**	**916**	10.2	37	6	0	0
2015	CHI	11	11	53	439	8.3	24	3	**2**	0
2016	NE	**16**	12	55	701	12.7	**58**	**7**	0	0
2017	GB	7	7	24	233	9.7	33	0	0	0
2017	NE	2	0	6	53	8.8	27	0	0	0
Career		144	107	433	4,573	10.6	58	30	4	1

=== Postseason ===
Year	Team	GP	GS	Receiving					Fumbles	
Year	Team	GP	GS	Rec	Yds	Avg	Lng	TD	Fum	Lost
2009	DAL	2	1	3	27	**9.0**	17	0	0	0
2016	NE	**3**	**3**	**11**	**98**	8.9	**25**	0	0	0
2017	NE	0	0	Did not play due to injury						
Career		5	4	14	125	8.9	25	0	0	0

== Other ventures ==
Bennett's first album, Fast Food, a joint effort with his brother Reshaud Bennett, was originally released in March 2012. Bennett says he has plans to rerelease it in the summer of 2014. On February 7, 2014, Bennett released a new mixtape for free through his Twitter account called Year of the Orange Dinosaur.

During 2014, Bennett announced plans to release an animated short film titled Zoovie. The film, starring Bennett, rapper Asher Roth, and ESPN personality Cari Champion, was aired during the Bears' Family Fest in 2015; Bennett himself provided the sketches and storyboards.

He is also a children's author, and released his first book Hey A.J. It's Saturday in 2016 through his own company, The Imagination Agency. Hey A.J.! has since been adapted into a television series on Disney Jr.

== Personal life ==
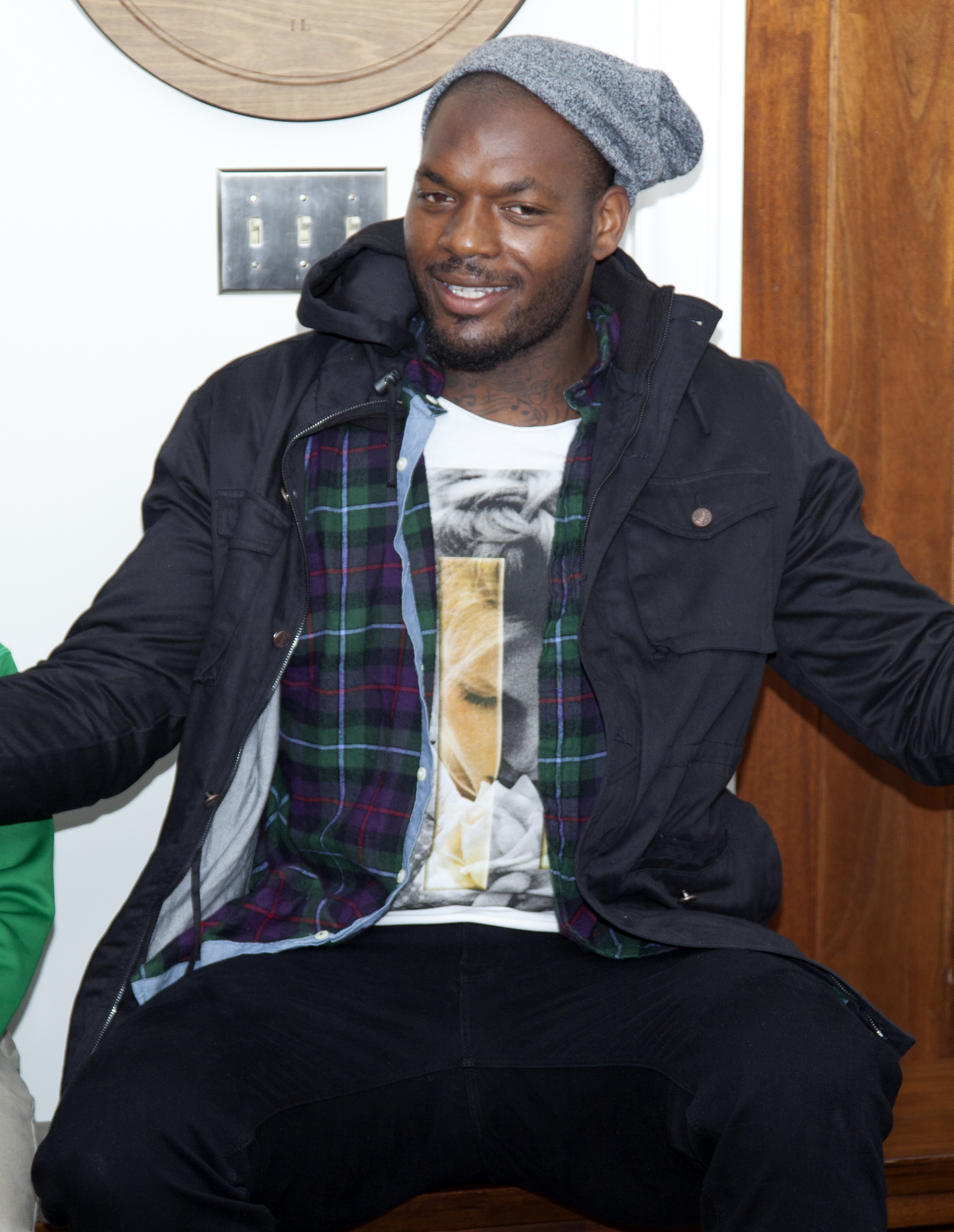
Bennett in 2013

Bennett is the younger brother of former NFL defensive end Michael Bennett. He is also a friend of former Buffalo Bills tight end Kevin Everett. After Everett's career-ending neck injury in 2007, Bennett chose to honor Everett by wearing his jersey number for two games during his 2007 junior season at Texas A&M.

He is also known for his sense of humor. As a Fort Worth Star-Telegram reporter put it, Bennett "had more memorable quotes than memorable catches at Texas A&M". After being drafted by the Cowboys, Bennett stated, when referring to incumbent quarterback Tony Romo: "Any quarterback that can get Jessica Simpson, I've got to play with him". The Cowboys addressed his comment shortly afterwards. During an interview at the NFL combine, when asked about his interest in both basketball and football, he responded: "Football is my wife and basketball is my mistress".

In January 2009, Bennett was fined $22,000 for an explicit rap song he posted on YouTube.
