= Hey A.J.! =

2026 American Disney Jr. television series

- Created by: Martellus Bennett; Jeff "Swampy" Marsh; Michael Hodges
- Based on: Hey A.J. by Martellus Bennett
- Voices of: Amari McCoy; Martellus Bennett; Jhené Aiko; Juliet Donenfeld; Innocent Ekakitie; David Mitchell
- Composers: Michael Hodges; Gerald Trottman
- Country of origin: United States
- Original language: English
- No. of seasons: 1
- No. of episodes: 25

Production
- Executive producers: Martellus Bennett; Scott Parish; Jeff "Swampy" Marsh; Michael Hodges
- Producers: Lance LeCompte; Helen Brown
- Running time: 24 minutes
- Production company: Surfing Giant Studios

Original release
- Network: Disney Jr.
- Release: January 13, 2026 – present

Hey A.J.! is an American animated children's television series created by Martellus Bennett, Jeff "Swampy" Marsh, and Michael Hodges, based on the book series of the same name by Bennett. The show revolves around a girl with a sprawling imagination named A.J., as she goes on imaginative adventures with her stuffed bunny, Theo, and her friends and family. It premiered on Disney Jr. on January 13, 2026, and was released on Disney+ the following day.

== Premise ==
Inspired by children's book author and former Super Bowl champion Martellus Bennett, the series is a whimsical and music-filled family comedy about an imaginative young girl who, along with her stuffed bunny sidekick Theo, uses her big imagination to make ordinary life moments extraordinary.

— The Walt Disney Company

== Cast and characters ==
- Amari McCoy as A.J. Bennett
- Martellus Bennett as Martellus "Marty", A.J.'s father
- Jhené Aiko as Siggi, A.J.'s mother
- Juliet Donenfeld as Jessie, (Note: Full name Jessie McKenzie Miller; revealed in "Hide and Sneak") A.J.'s best friend
- Innocent Ekakitie as Jazz, A.J.'s best friend
- David Mitchell as:
  - Theo, A.J.'s stuffed bunny
  - Mal, A.J.'s maternal grandfather and Siggi's father
- Meghan Trainor as Maggie, Jessie's workaholic mother
- Melissa Navia as Eliana, Jazz's mother
- Lena Waithe as Tanisha, Jazz's mother
- Phil LaMarr as Tank, A.J.'s uncle and Marty's brother
- Loni Love as Tiff, A.J.'s aunt and Tank's wife
- Peyton Goodrum as Tisha and Tasha, A.J.'s cousins
- Deidrie Henry as Luanne, A.J.'s paternal grandmother and Marty and Tank's mother
- Cree Summer as Miss Albertine
- Yonas Kibreab as Albert, Miss Albertine's grandson
- Kate Micucci as Nikki, A.J.'s teddy bear
- Phil Morris as Carl, A.J.'s paternal grandfather and Marty and Tank's father

== Episodes ==
No.	Title	Directed by	Written by	Storyboard by	Original release date	Prod. code
1	"To Mommy with Lava"	Kevin Altieri & Mick Harrison	Ta'riq Fisher	Mick Harrison & Fadiah Alhalik	January 13, 2026	101
1	"Happy Friendship Birthday"	Craig Clark & Mick Harrison	Craig Carlisle	Sydney Sata	January 13, 2026	101
To Mommy with Lava: A.J. and Marty want to make the best dessert for Siggi, but their chocolate volcano cake gets messed up. Happy Friendship Birthday: A.J. fails to remember why today is so special for Jessie.
2	"Donation Situation"	Kevin Altieri & Mick Harrison	Craig Carlisle	Kyky Yang	January 13, 2026	102
2	"Birthday Bop"	Craig Clark & Mick Harrison	Camille Corbett	Anya Martin	January 13, 2026	102
Donation Situation: After a cat burglar takes A.J.'s jacket, Detective A.J. and Jessie chase them. Birthday Bop: A.J. makes a song for Siggi's birthday, but she has to conquer her fear of singing it to her.
3	"Come Here Chameleon"	Kevin Altieri	Charlotte Wilson-Langley	Mick Harrison	January 13, 2026	103
3	"The Trouble with Jazz"	Kevin Altieri	Ta'riq Fisher	Francesco Cipolla	January 13, 2026	103
Come Here Chameleon: A.J. is babysitting Jessie's favorite chameleon. The Trouble with Jazz: A.J. and Jessie become friends with Jazz and help him experience imagination.
4	"The Long Long Ride"	Craig Clark & Mick Harrison	Craig Carlisle	Anya Martin	January 13, 2026	104
4	"Buggin'"	Mick Harrison	Dara Frazier	Kyky Yang	January 13, 2026	104
The Long Long Ride: During a long ride home, A.J. uses her imagination to help her patience until she can fall asleep. Buggin: Adventurer A.J. has to find Theo in the jungle.
5	"Building Blockers"	Sean Petrilak	Ta'riq Fisher	Anya Martin & Rae Huang	January 13, 2026	110
5	"Bein' Neon Cleon"	Sean Petrilak	Craig Carlisle	Sydney Sata	January 13, 2026	110
Building Blockers: A.J. and Jessie compete with Jazz after he refuses to build a tower with them together. Bein' Neon Cleon: A.J. loses Marty's favorite toy as a kid, Neon Cleon, a wrestling action figure, after she hides him.
6	"Nothing But the Tooth"	Mick Harrison	Charlotte Wilson-Langley	Mick Harrison	January 13, 2026	105
6	"Independence Day"	Craig Clark	Camille Corbett	Kyky Yang	January 13, 2026	105
Nothing But the Tooth: A.J. and Jessie fear of going to the dentist, so in their imagination, Super-Duper A.J., Super Jessie, and Theo The Wonder Hare have to stop a cavity monster. Independence Day: A.J. walks to Jazz's house all by herself for the first time.
7	"By the Numbas"	Mick Harrison	Charlotte Wilson-Langley	Kaitlen Yoo	January 13, 2026	107
7	"Knot Today"	Bernie Petterson	Charlotte Wilson-Langley	Sydney Sata	January 13, 2026	107
By the Numbas: A.J. needs help with her math homework. Knot Today: A.J.'s hair keeps getting messed up despite multiple attempts by Marty to correct it.
8	"Keep on Truckin'"	Craig Clark & Bernie Petterson	Charlotte Wilson-Langley	Jessica Xu	January 16, 2026	106
8	"Don't Mess with AJ" "Don't Mess with A.J."	Mick Harrison	Camille Corbett	Francesco Cipolla	January 16, 2026	106
Keep on Truckin': After Siggi gets a food truck that is broken down, A.J. and Marty surprise her with a repaired one. Don't Mess with AJ: A.J. has to clean up her room to watch a Captain Durag movie with her father.
9	"Attic Adventures"	Mick Harrison	Camille Corbett	Siti Lu & Sydney Sata	January 23, 2026	108
9	"Drone Alone"	Sean Petrilak	Ta'riq Fisher	Jessica Xu	January 23, 2026	108
Attic Adventures: A.J. loses her favorite bowling ball, and has to find it with her lost toys. Drone Alone: A.J. is excited to play with her new drone with Marty, but she has to go "step by step" as the toy needs to be assembled first.
10	"Parent of the Month"	Mick Harrison	Story by : Sib Ventress; Teleplay by : Eva Konstantopoulos	Francesco Cipolla	January 30, 2026	114
10	"Can You Dig It?"	Sean Petrilak	Story by : Regina Hoyles; Teleplay by : LaNisa Frederick	Jessica Xu	January 30, 2026	114
Parent of the Month: Jessie's mom wins parent of the month. Can You Dig It?: A.J. and Jessie search for dinosaurs.
11	"Cloud Jumpers"	Sean Petrilak	Ta'riq Fisher	Kyky Yang	February 6, 2026	112
11	"The Present"	Sean Petrilak	Camille Corbett	Jessica Xu	February 6, 2026	112
Cloud Jumpers: A.J. and Jessie want to play kickball outside, but have trouble to when it is so hot, so they have to stop Major FOMO as they don't want to go inside and watch sports on TV. The Present: A.J. has difficulties falling asleep due to an action figure she wants known as the Turbo Titan Ranger.
12	"Rain, Rain, You Can Stay"	Sean Petrilak	Charlotte Wilson-Langley	Sydney Sata	February 13, 2026 (Note: This episode was first released on Disney+ on February 11, 2026.)	123
12	"Care and Care Alike"	Mick Harrison	Keely Ventress	Abby Bulmer	February 13, 2026	123
Rain, Rain, You Can Stay: A.J., Jazz and Jessie want to go outside, but it is raining, which ruins their BBQ and their instruments. To make the sun come out, they write a song by using what's around them. Care and Care Alike: Marty hurts his back while playing with A.J., but when Mimi and Siggi make stew for him, they focus too much on which stew is Marty's favorite.
13	"AJ's Big Mess" "A.J.'s Big Mess"	Mick Harrison	Ta'riq Fisher	Gaia Ruggenini	February 20, 2026	111
13	"Rock-King It"	Mick Harrison	Story by : Camille Corbett; Teleplay by : Keely Ventress	Kyky Yang	February 20, 2026	111
AJ's Big Mess: A.J. is having so much fun in the rain that she wants to live outside, refusing to go indoors despite being messy. Rock-King It: A.J., Jessie, and Jazz have a "Sword in the Stone" contest to determine who plays the toy guitar first, ignoring Albert.
14	"It's Not Easy Eating Greens"	Mick Harrison	Sarah Moss	Francesco Cipolla & Abby Bulmer	February 27, 2026	118
14	"Hide and Go Sneak"	Sean Petrilak	Charlotte Wilson-Langley	Sydney Sata	February 27, 2026	118
It's Not Easy Eating Greens: A.J. has difficulties eating vegetables known as "Lovable Leaves". Hide and Go Sneak: A.J. and Jessie spend a long time trying to find where Albert is hiding at.
15	"Make Way for Play"	Sean Petrilak	Regina Hoyles	Erik Knutson	March 6, 2026	119
15	"And Stuff Like That"	Sean Petrilak	Camille Corbett	Sydney Sata	March 6, 2026	119
Make Way for Play: A.J. and Jessie help Maggie get back into the mood of playing. And Stuff Like That: A.J. and Jessie's electronics keep running out of battery power.
16	"Rollin'"	Mick Harrison	Story by : Charlotte Wilson-Langley; Teleplay by : Sarah Moss	Abby Bulmer	March 13, 2026	109
16	"Game Day"	Mick Harrison	Ta'riq Fisher	Francesco Cipolla	March 13, 2026	109
Rollin': A.J. and Jessie practice roller skating. Game Day: Marty experiences FOMO after remembering of being a football player. Super Duper A.J. has to rescue him.
17	"Bunnybusters"	Sean Petrilak	Craig Carlisle	Kyky Lang	March 20, 2026	114
17	"Friendly Competition"	Mick Harrison	Story by : Camille Corbett; Teleplay by : Sarah Moss	Abby Bulmer	March 20, 2026	114
Bunnybusters: A.J. hears spooky sounds in the house. She must find out what is making them. Friendly Competition: Family tensions heat up as game night continues.
18	"Tooth or Dare"	Mick Harrison	Aydrea Walden	Abby Bulmer	March 27, 2026	120
18	"Time in a Bottle"	Sean Petrilak	Kate Moran	Jessica Xu	March 27, 2026	120
Tooth Or Dare: A.J. has a lose tooth, and she tries to get it out with the help of Super Jessie and Theo The Wonder Hare. Time in a Bottle: A.J. and Jessie help get Jazz into the space experience.
19	"A Little Squirrely"	Mick Harrison	Sarah Moss	Gaia Ruggenini	April 3, 2026	121
19	"If I Saved the World"	Mick Harrison	Regina Hoyles	Francesco Cipolla	April 3, 2026	121
A Little Squirrely: A.J. and Marty set up a bird feeder for some bird watching, but a squirrel named Squeakycheeks disrupt their plans. If I Saved the World: A.J. and Jessie search for a supervillain in the park to be like Captain Durag.
20	"Jester-Rella"	Mick Harrison	Regina Hoyles	Francésco Cipolla	April 10, 2026	117
20	"Game Recognize Game"	Mick Harrison	Story by : Sib Ventress; Teleplay by : Senibo Myers	Jessica Xu	April 10, 2026	117
Jester-Rella: Jessie gets sad and goes into hiding when her mom is unable to join her for an upcoming dance at school, so A.J. and Theo try finding her. Game Recognize Game: A.J., Theo, and her parents search for the missing pieces to their board games so they can have a game night.
21	"Gettin' in Step!"	Mick Harrison	Ta'riq Fisher & Sib Ventress	Francesco Cipolla	May 1, 2026	124
21	"Family Harmony"	Sean Petrilak	Regina Hoyles	Jessica Xu	May 1, 2026	124
Gettin' in Step!: A.J. and Marty search for the steps to a popular dance routine among their family. Family Harmony: When A.J., her twin cousins, and Theo get locked in her room, they must learn to get along to make themselves loud enough for the parents to rescue them.
22	"Not the Hiccups"	Mick Harrison	Charlotte Wilson-Langley	Gaia Ruggenini	June 5, 2026 (Note: This episode was first released on Disney+ on May 13, 2026.)	113
22	"The Captain Durag Effect"	Mick Harrison	Camille Corbett	Abby Bulmer	June 5, 2026	113
Not the Hiccups: When Jazz's hiccups turn him into a monster, A.J., Jessie, and Theo search Boptopia's castle for their long lost book on how to cure them. The Captain Durag Effect: To try and boost Jazz's confidence on his first karate class, he and A.J. meet Captain Durag, whose in the middle of confidence issues himself since a villain named Karate Trevor stole his signature headgear.
23	"Somebunny's Missing"	Mick Harrison	Charlotte Wilson-Langley	Miguel Delicado	July 3, 2026	123
23	"Follow the Leader"	Mick Harrison	Ta'riq Fisher	Sydney Sata	July 3, 2026	123
Somebunny's Missing: When A.J.'s obsession with a video game makes her lose track of Theo, she and Jessie travel through space to find him. Follow the Leader: During a camping trip, Squeakycheeks returns and snatches Jessie's bag of special marshmallows, and A.J. struggles with listening to her friends due to her usually being the leader.
24	"Lights Out"	Mick Harrison	Story by : Sam Bissonnette; Teleplay by : Aydrea Walden	Abby Bulmer	August 7, 2026	124
24	"AJ and Grandad's Epic Playlist" "A.J. and Grandad's Epic Playlist"	Sean Petrilak	Story by : Charlotte Wilson-Langley; Teleplay by : Mary Bronaugh	Jessica Xu	August 7, 2026	124
Lights Out: Astronauts A.J., Jessie, and Jazz confront a hungry black hole to save the stars in space when the lights go out. AJ and Grandad's Epic Playlist: A.J. and her grandad select their favorite tracks to prepare for an upcoming family banquet.
25	"Hey, It's Halloween"	Mick Harrison	Craig Carlisle	Francesco Cipolla & Gaia Ruggenini	September 28, 2026	125
A.J.'s struggling to find the perfect Halloween costume, so she consults her and Theo's different personas to find out, while also dealing with major FOMO.

== Production ==
The series was officially announced in April 2022 during the Disney Junior Fun Fest event at Disney California Adventure. In August 2025, it was announced the cast and a first look at the series in the Disney Junior "Let's Play!" event.

== Release ==
Content related to the show had been released in the months preceding to the series' release, including the theme song in December 2025. The series premiered on January 13, 2026 on Disney Jr., and was released on Disney+ the following day.

== Reception ==
Fernanda Camargo of Common Sense Media rated the series a four-out-of-five stars, praising the execution and overall upbeat presentation.

=== Captain Durag criticism ===
On February 17, 2026, the series suffered major backlash with the introduction of Captain Durag in the eighth episode, with many calling his character extremely disrespectful, as it highlights negative stereotypes, such as the character living in "Slime City".

==== Creator response ====
Writer Camille Corbett defended the character, stating he was intended to challenge "respectability politics" and serve as a "celebration of Black life". She described him as a homage to Blaxploitation films meant to give children a hero who reflects their world without apology. She also responded with surprise that people are finding the character problematic.
