= Chorus of Souls =

American band

Chorus of Souls was an industrial music, art rock, darkwave Los Angeles band formed in 1988. The main members of the band were drummer Craig Clark, keyboardist Tom Bailey, guitarist Thomas "Chas"Connors, bassist Kenny Lefort, and singer Jill Sparks. The band broke up in 1992. Singer Jill Sparks died July 19, 2011, in Knoxville, Tennessee.

== Discography ==
- Chorus of Souls (Fluxus Records)
- Tales from the Vault (compilation on Allegiance Records)
- Astrothrill: Desert Planet Disk (compilation on Fluxus Records)

== Trivia ==
An early version of Tool (band) formed at singer Jill Sparks house in 1990.

Chorus of Souls music appears on the Craig Clark animated features, The Kustomonsters Movie (2015) and Kustomonsters 2 (2020).
