= Blade Runner 2049 (soundtrack) =

Blade Runner 2049 – Original Motion Picture Soundtrack

Soundtrack album by Hans Zimmer and Benjamin Wallfisch
- Released: October 5, 2017
- Length: 93:44
- Label: Epic/ASG
- Producers: Michael Hodges; Kayla Morrison; Ashley Culp

Hans Zimmer chronology
Dunkirk: Original Motion Picture Soundtrack (2017)	Blade Runner 2049: Original Motion Picture Soundtrack (2017)	Widows: Original Motion Picture Soundtrack (2018)

Benjamin Wallfisch chronology
It: Original Motion Picture Soundtrack (2017)	Blade Runner 2049: Original Motion Picture Soundtrack (2017)	The Darkest Minds: Original Motion Picture Soundtrack (2018)

Blade Runner 2049 – Original Motion Picture Soundtrack is the soundtrack album for the 2017 film Blade Runner 2049. Released in October 2017, the album contains music composed by Hans Zimmer and Benjamin Wallfisch, along with additional tracks by Elvis Presley, Frank Sinatra and Lauren Daigle. The soundtrack was produced by Michael Hodges, Kayla Morrison and Ashley Culp. It also includes the piece "Tears in the Rain", which was originally composed and performed (as "Tears in Rain") by Vangelis, the composer of the original 1982 soundtrack Blade Runner.

Blade Runner 2049 is the sequel to Ridley Scott's 1982 film Blade Runner. Directed by Denis Villeneuve, it stars Ryan Gosling and Harrison Ford, Ana de Armas, Sylvia Hoeks and Jared Leto. Set thirty years after the original film, the story depicts a bioengineered human, a replicant blade runner named K, who discovers the remains of a once-pregnant replicant. To prevent a possible war between replicants and humans, K is secretly tasked with finding the child and destroying all evidence related to it.

The soundtrack was nominated for the BAFTA Award for Best Film Music at the 71st British Academy Film Awards. In 2018, the soundtrack received a Grammy nomination for Best Score Soundtrack for Visual Media, losing to Ludwig Göransson's score for Black Panther.

== History ==
Warner Bros. reportedly considered engaging the rapper and music producer El-P to write the film score for Blade Runner 2049, and he was commissioned to write a short score for the film's first trailer. Conscious of the legacy of Vangelis's score for the original 1982 film, El-P's composition made use of a Yamaha CS-80 analog synthesizer, an instrument used by Vangelis. However, El-P's music was not used in the end, and he has stated that his score was "rejected (or ignored)".

Jóhann Jóhannsson, who had worked with Villeneuve on Prisoners, Sicario, and Arrival, was initially announced as composer for the film. However, Villeneuve and Jóhann decided to end the collaboration because Villeneuve felt the film "needed something different, and I needed to go back to something closer to Vangelis's soundtrack". New composers Hans Zimmer and Benjamin Wallfisch joined in July 2017. In September, Jóhann's agent confirmed that he was no longer involved and that he was contractually forbidden from commenting on the situation.

According to Epic Records, Zimmer and Wallfisch sought to continue the legacy of the original Blade Runner score by incorporating the Yamaha CS-80 synthesizer. Zimmer has said of the soundtrack: "First of all, I realized that Denis [Villeneuve] is a director who has a vision; he has a voice. Remember, I've done a lot of movies with Ridley Scott. So, it was important that this was an autonomous piece of work. Let's just be honest. Ridley is a hard act to follow—as is Vangelis. While Ben [Wallfisch] was four-years-old, I had actually experienced all of this. We watched and literally, as we stopped watching, we decided on the palette. We decided this wasn't going to be an orchestral thing. The story spoke to us."

== Release ==
The soundtrack album was released online on October 5, 2017, and a two-disc CD version was released on the Epic Records/ASG Records label in the United States on October 27.

On October 25, 2017, it was announced that a vinyl double-LP of the soundtrack album would be released on December 15, 2017, in a numbered limited edition of 2500, pressed on 180-gram premium vinyl, intended for audiophiles. Although the information about the release mentioned that the album would have 24 tracks, the advertised tracks on sites selling it shows only 20 tracks, with the tracks by Frank Sinatra and Elvis Presley being omitted from the LPs.

== Track listing ==
All tracks are written by Hans Zimmer and Benjamin Wallfisch, unless otherwise noted.

No.	Title	Length
1.	"2049"	3:37
2.	"Sapper's Tree"	1:36
3.	"Flight to LAPD"	1:47
4.	"Summer Wind" (^{†} performed by Frank Sinatra)	2:54
5.	"Rain"	2:26
6.	"Wallace"	5:23
7.	"Memory"	2:32
8.	"Mesa"	3:10
9.	"Orphanage"	1:13
10.	"Furnace"	3:41
11.	"Someone Lived This"	3:13
12.	"Joi"	3:51
13.	"Pilot"	2:17
14.	"Suspicious Minds" (^{†} performed by Elvis Presley)	4:22
15.	"Can't Help Falling in Love" (^{†} performed by Elvis Presley & the Jordanaires)	3:02
16.	"One for My Baby (and One More for the Road)" (^{†} performed by Frank Sinatra)	4:24
17.	"Hijack"	5:32
18.	"That's Why We Believe"	3:36
19.	"Her Eyes Were Green"	6:17
20.	"Sea Wall"	9:52
21.	"All the Best Memories Are Hers"	3:22
22.	"Tears in the Rain" (originally by Vangelis)	2:10
23.	"Blade Runner"	10:05
24.	"Almost Human" (performed by Lauren Daigle)	3:00

Note ^{†} indicates tracks that are not on the limited edition two-LP vinyl release

== Charts ==
Chart (2017)	Peak position
Belgian Albums (Ultratop Flanders)	56
Belgian Albums (Ultratop Wallonia)	69
Canadian Albums (Billboard)	59
French Albums (SNEP)	188
Italian Compilation Albums (FIMI)	8
Polish Albums (ZPAV)	43
Scottish Albums (Official Charts)	47
Spanish Albums (Promusicae)	48
Swiss Albums (Schweizer Hitparade)	64
UK Albums (Official Charts)	43
UK Soundtrack Albums (Official Charts)	4
US Billboard 200	53
US Soundtrack Albums (Billboard)	2

== Certifications ==
Region	Certification	Certified units/sales
United Kingdom (BPI)	Silver	60,000^{‡}
^{‡} Sales+streaming figures based on certification alone.
