= Heroes and Villains Entertainment =

American production and management company

- logo
- Founded: 2007
- Founder: Markus Goerg, Dick Hillenbrand, Mikhail Nayfeld
- Country of origin: United States
- Headquarters location: Hollywood
- Key people: Markus Goerg, Dick Hillenbrand, Mikhail Nayfeld, Robert Watts
- Official website: www.heroesandvillains-ent.com

Heroes and Villains Entertainment, LLC is a Hollywood-based production and management company.

== History ==
The company was founded in November 2007 by Markus Georg, Dick Hillenbrand, and Mikhail Nayfeld. Located on The Lot, Heroes and Villains Entertainment specializes in content creation for film, TV, video games, comic books, and the Internet as well as the representation of content creators in those areas.

== Management ==
Heroes and Villains Entertainment represents a wide range of writers in film, TV and literature. Among them are:

- Dan Erickson, creator, writer and executive producer of Severance
- Michael Markowitz, writer of Horrible Bosses
- Ransom Riggs, author of The Sherlock Holmes Handbook and Miss Peregrine's Home for Peculiar Children, published by Quirk Books
- Maggie Marr, author of Hollywood Girls Club and its sequel, Secrets of the Hollywood Girls Club
- Jordan Mechner, creator of the Prince of Persia video game franchise.

== Comics ==
Since 2008, Heroes and Villains Entertainment has had a co-imprint partnership agreement with Top Cow Productions, through which they publish original comic book series which serve as the source material for feature film, television, and game productions. Among them are:

=== Tracker ===
Debuted at San Diego Comic-Con in 2009, Tracker is a five issue comic book mini series written by Jonathan Lincoln with art by Francis Tsai, Derec Donovan and Abhishek Malsuni. It tells the story of an FBI agent named Alex O’Roark, whose pursuit of a serial killer leads him to unexplored territory when it is revealed the killer is also a werewolf.

=== Epoch ===
Debuted at San Diego Comic-Con in 2011, Epoch is a five issue comic book mini series written by Kevin McCarthy, with art by Paolo Pantalena and Jorge Fares. The main character, NYPD detective Jonah Wright discovers his supernatural heritage while investigating the murder of his partner Michael. To expose the killer, Wright must compete in EPOCH, an ancient fighting tournament that will determine the future of humanity.

=== Netherworld ===
First released in May 2011, Netherworld is a five issue comic book mini series written by Bryan Edward Hill and Rob Levin, with art by Tony Shasteen. The plot revolves around Ray Parker, a bounty hunter who just wants to do his job and be left alone, but when he's charged with finding and protecting a missing girl, he finds out that they're all souls trapped in a hellish version of Purgatory, and the girl is their last hope for escaping it.

=== Son of Merlin ===
First released in February 2013, Son of Merlin is a five issue comic book mini series written by Robert Place Napton with art by Zid. The narrative follows Simon Ambrose, a brilliant young professor at MIT who discovers he is the bastard son of the wizard Merlin. Forced to put his skepticism aside, Ambrose embraces a world of magic and the mayhem it embodies.

=== Bushido: The Way of the Warrior ===
First released in October 2013, Bushido: The Way of the Warrior is a five issue comic book mini series written by Rob Levin, with art by Jessada Sutthi. The story focuses on a foreigner adopted into a samurai family who battles against vampires to rescue the woman he loves and save his adopted homeland from certain annihilation.

=== American Legends ===
First released in November 2014, American Legends is a five issue comic book mini series written by Bill Schwartz and Zachary Schwartz, with art by Studio Hive. The main characters and legendary pioneers Davy Crockett, Mike Fink, and Sally Ann Thunder team up on a quest to save the Lewis & Clark expedition and thwart a conspiracy hatched by Napoleon to destroy the United States.

== See also ==
- Top Cow Productions
- Tracker
- Epoch
- Netherworld
- Son of Merlin
- Bushido: The Way of the Warrior
