= Kira Davis =

American film producer

- Education: New Mexico State University
- Occupation: Film producer
- Title: Former vice president of production and marketing (Alcon Entertainment)
- Term: 1998–2006
- Spouse: Andrew A. Kosove
- Children: 2

Kira Davis is an American film producer. She is a former vice president of marketing for Alcon Entertainment.

== Background ==
Kira Davis is a native of Santa Fe, New Mexico. She studied theatre with an emphasis in directing and graduated magna cum laude from New Mexico State University. After graduating, she worked in a series of professional theatres, including La Jolla Playhouse and the Mark Taper Forum. She is married to Andrew A. Kosove, one of the co-founders of Alcon Entertainment, and the couple have two children.

== Career ==
Davis met Alcon co-founders Broderick Johnson and Andrew Kosove on the set of the 1996 film Love Is All There Is, in which she served as a costume assistant. Davis began working with them as an assistant in 1997 when Johnson and Kosove formed Alcon in 1997, becoming the company's first employee. A year later, Davis was promoted to production executive and served in production and marketing for the company. During her tenure at Alcon, she oversaw the productions of several films produced by the company. Davis left her post in 2006 to start a production company. In 2007, she entered into a first-look producing deal with Alcon Entertainment and formed her own production company, 8:38 Productions. The first film to be produced by Davis's company was Prisoners, a 2013 thriller starring Hugh Jackman and Jake Gyllenhaal. The film, which had been in development since 2009, was released on September 20, 2013.

== Filmography ==
She was a producer in all films unless otherwise noted.

=== Film ===
Year	Film	Credit
2001	The Affair of the Necklace	Co-producer
2003	Love Don't Cost a Thing	Co-producer
2004	Chasing Liberty	Co-producer
2005	Racing Stripes	Co-producer
2005	The Sisterhood of the Traveling Pants	Executive producer
2008	The Sisterhood of the Traveling Pants 2	
2013	Prisoners	

Miscellaneous crew

Year	Film	Role
1999	Lost & Found	Production executive
2000	My Dog Skip	Production executive
