= Point Break (2015 film) =

2015 film by Ericson Core

- Theatrical release poster
- Directed by: Ericson Core
- Screenplay by: Kurt Wimmer
- Story by: Rick King; W. Peter Iliff; Kurt Wimmer
- Based on: Point Break by: Rick King; W. Peter Iliff (Note: In December 2025, James Cameron claimed that he "wrote Point Break" and was unjustly denied a credit by the WGA, stating, "I flat out got stiffed by the Writers Guild on that. It was bullshit." Credited screenwriter Iliff responded by acknowledging that Cameron added scenes to the script in his capacity as executive producer—noting that this is "commonplace on studio pictures"—but that he did not add enough material to earn a screenwriting credit under WGA rules. Iliff said that he "always make[s] sure to give Jim credit when publicly asked to speak about the film", but pointed out that the WGA had access to every draft of the screenplay when making their decision.)
- Produced by: Andrew A. Kosove; Broderick Johnson; John Baldecchi; David Valdes; Christopher Taylor; Kurt Wimmer
- Starring: Édgar Ramírez; Luke Bracey; Teresa Palmer; Delroy Lindo; Ray Winstone
- Cinematography: Ericson Core
- Edited by: Thom Noble; Gerald B. Greenberg; John Duffy
- Music by: Tom Holkenborg
- Production companies: Alcon Entertainment; DMG Entertainment; Erman Productions; Studio Babelsberg
- Distributed by: Warner Bros. Pictures (United States, Canada, Latin America, United Kingdom, Ireland, the CIS and Japan); Concorde Filmverleih (Germany and Austria); China Film Group Corporation (China); Lionsgate (International)
- Release dates: December 1, 2015 (Beijing); December 25, 2015 (United States)
- Running time: 114 minutes
- Countries: United States; Germany; China
- Language: English
- Budget: $105 million
- Box office: $133.7 million

Point Break is a 2015 action-thriller film directed and shot by Ericson Core and written by Kurt Wimmer. He co-produced it with John Baldecchi, Broderick Johnson, Andrew A. Kosove, Christopher Taylor and David Valdes.

An American-German-Chinese co-production, the film is a remake of the 1991 film of the same name, which starred Patrick Swayze and Keanu Reeves.

The film stars Édgar Ramírez, Luke Bracey, Teresa Palmer, Delroy Lindo and Ray Winstone, and was released in China on December 4, 2015, by China Film Group Corporation and in the United States on December 25, 2015, by Warner Bros. Pictures in 3D and RealD 3D. The film received negative reviews from critics who considered it inferior to the original, and grossed $134 million from a $105 million budget.

== Plot ==
Extreme sport athlete Johnny Utah and his friend Jeff are traversing a steep ridgeline on motorbikes. The run ends with a jump onto a lone stone column, where Jeff overshoots the landing and falls to his death.

Seven years later, Utah is an FBI agent candidate. He attends a briefing on a skyscraper heist in Mumbai, in which the criminals stole diamonds, escaping by parachute. A similar heist happens in Mexico where the criminals unload millions of dollars in bills, then disappear into the Cave of Swallows.

Utah's research concludes that they were done by the same men, who are attempting to complete the Ozaki 8, a list of eight extreme ordeals to honor the forces of nature. They have already completed three, and Utah predicts they'll attempt the fourth on a rare sea wave phenomenon in France. After presenting his analysis, Utah is sent undercover to France under a field agent named Pappas. They reach France and Utah gets help from others to surf the tall tube wave.

As he goes in, there is already another surfer riding the wave, leaving Utah unstable. Utah gets sucked into the wave and faints, but the other surfer bails and rescues Utah. He wakes aboard a yacht with the surfer, Bodhi, and his team: Roach, Chowder, and Grommet. They leave him to enjoy the party and he gets acquainted with a girl, Samsara.

The next day, Utah finds the men in an abandoned Paris train station after he overhears them talking about the location. Bodhi gives him an initiation fight and soon he is accepted into the circle. They travel to the Alps for the next ordeal: wingsuit flying through "The Life of Wind" cliffs. The four succeed in their attempt and spend some time together with Samsara. The next day, they climb the snow peaks for the sixth ordeal, snowboarding down a steep mountain of snow. They reach their spot, but Utah decides to extend his line, so the others follow him. Chowder slips and falls to his death, and Utah becomes depressed about it.

After a party, Samsara explains that she and Bodhi both knew Ono Ozaki when they were young, that her parents died in an avalanche accident and Ozaki gave her a home after. She explains further that after Ozaki completed his third ordeal, despite what was widely believed that he died attempting the ordeal, he was actually killed by a whaling ship crashing into his boat while he was trying to save humpback whales. On his boat, Bodhi (a young boy at the time) decided not to tell the truth of his story but to finish what Ozaki started.

Next they travel to a gold mine where Bodhi detonates explosives Grommet and Roach planted. After blowing his cover, Utah chases Bodhi, managing to trip his bike. Bodhi escapes because Utah cannot stand up after the crash. The FBI freezes Bodhi's sponsors' assets; Bodhi plans to rob a nearby Italian bank on a mountain top. Utah and the police intercept the group, resulting in a crossfire that kills Roach. As the group flees, Utah chases and shoots one of them to death, who is revealed to be Samsara and not Bodhi.

Utah finds the location of the next ordeal: free solo climbing with no safety beside Angel Falls in Venezuela. He finds Bodhi and Grommet and chases them on the climb, but Grommet falters, falling to his death. Utah catches up to Bodhi, but he falls backward down the waterfall, completing what should have been the last ordeal. Bodhi, however, has to redo the fourth ordeal, because he bailed out on the wave when he chose to save Johnny. Seventeen months later, Utah finds him in the Pacific facing another giant wave. As Utah tries to get Bodhi to come back with him and pay for his crimes, he eventually lets Bodhi attempt to surf it, both knowing that he will not come back. The wave engulfs Bodhi, killing him. Utah begins going through his own ordeals, unclear whether he is still an FBI agent.

== Cast ==
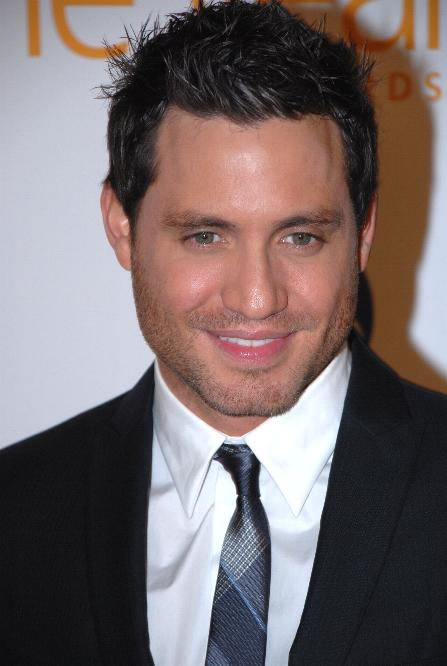
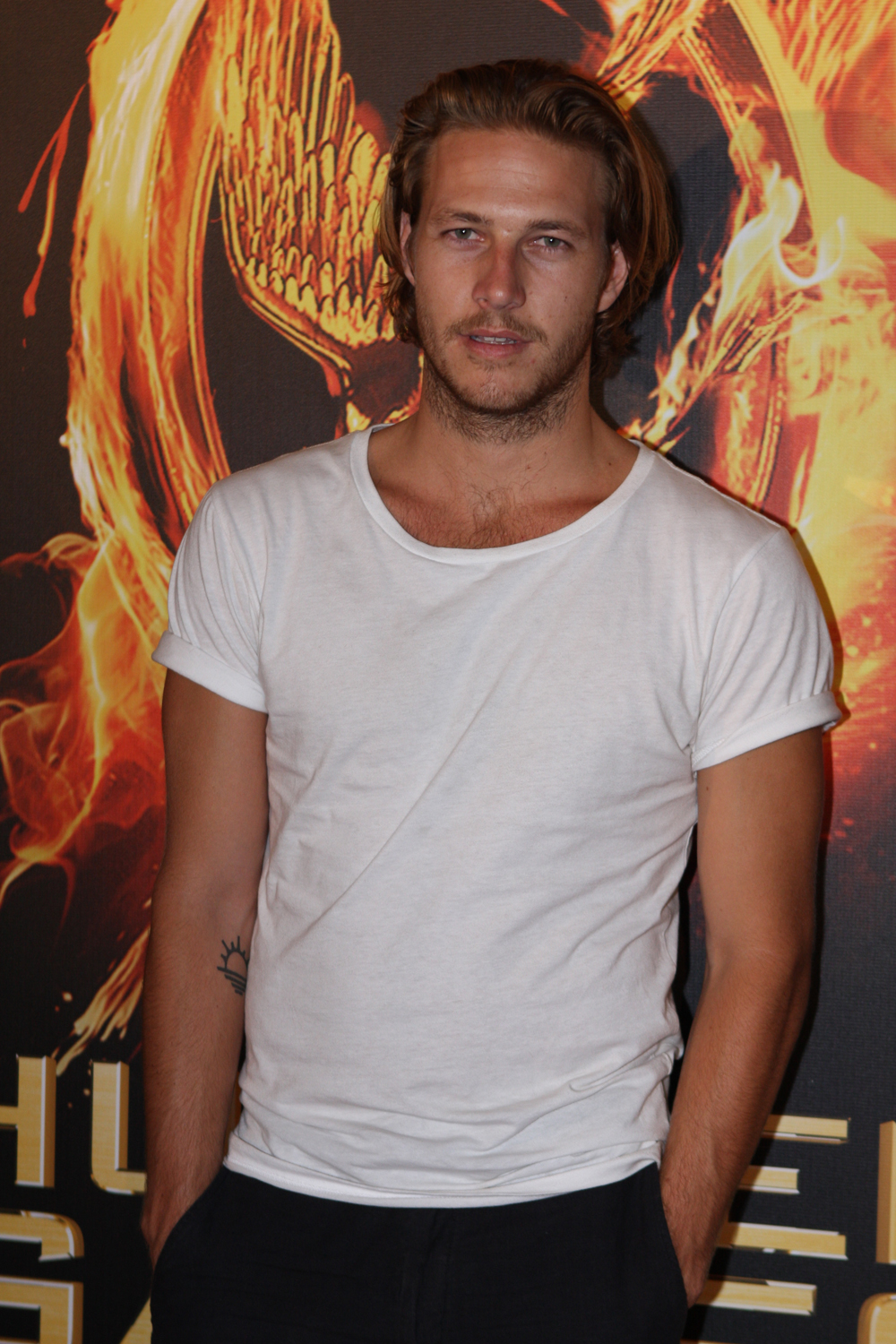
Édgar Ramírez and Luke Bracey portray the two main characters of the film.
- Édgar Ramírez as "Bodhi", an ecoterrorist.
- Luke Bracey as Johnny "Utah" Brigham, an FBI agent and former extreme motocross star and a surfer turned into an "extreme athlete." Unlike the original film, Utah is not an ex-football player.
  - Judah Lewis as Young Johnny "Utah" Brigham
- Ray Winstone as Angelo Pappas, an FBI special agent based in London.
- Teresa Palmer as Samsara Dietz, a love interest of Johnny Utah and secondary antagonist affiliated with Bodhi.
- Matias Varela as Grommet
- Clemens Schick as "Roach" Rottinger
- Tobias Santelmann as "Chowder"
- Max Thieriot as Jeff
- Delroy Lindo as FBI Instructor Hall
- Nikolai Kinski as Pascal Al-Fariq
- Glynis Barber as FBI Special Agent Esposito
- Steve Toussaint as FBI Director Bowman
- Bojesse Christopher as FBI Deputy Director #1
- James LeGros as FBI Deputy Director #2
- Steve Aoki as Himself
- Numan Acar as Turkish Doorman

== Production ==
=== Development ===
Point Break is an American-German-Chinese co-production. Studio Babelsberg co-produced and oversaw production services for the film. A script for the remake had been lying around for years, but it was not until Ericson Core pitched his idea to Warner Bros. that the film actually got off the ground. However, Core's idea for the film was significantly different than the script. His concept was much more of a big tentpole movie, with scenes that defy the laws of physics.

In 2011, it was announced that a remake of Point Break was being developed by Alcon Entertainment and Warner Bros. The screenplay was being written by Kurt Wimmer, screenwriter of the 2012 Total Recall remake. Wimmer co-produced with Broderick Johnson, Andrew Kosove, John Baldecchi, and Chris Taylor. Ericson Core, cinematographer of The Fast and the Furious (2001), directed. The film received funds of €3.6 million, from the German Federal Film Fund (DFFF).

=== Casting ===
Luke Bracey portrayed the role previously played by Keanu Reeves. Ray Winstone took on the role played by Gary Busey in the original. Gerard Butler was initially in negotiations to play Bodhi, the role Patrick Swayze created, but negotiations fell through. By mid-May 2014, Édgar Ramírez was in talks to play Bodhi, and was later cast.

James LeGros and BoJesse Christopher, two of the actors who played Ex-Presidents in the 1991 film, were cast as FBI directors.

=== Filming and stunts ===
Principal photography commenced on June 26, 2014, in Berlin. Shortly before production began in Berlin, Core got the cast and crew together to watch the original Point Break. Shooting took place in a total of 11 countries across four continents, using actual extreme sports stars and stuntmen. Locations include Berlin/Germany, Hall in Tirol, Lienz and Carinthia/Austria, Italy, Switzerland, Hawaii, Tahiti, Mexico, Arizona, Utah, Venezuela, France, India, and the United Kingdom. While the original film focused on just a few sports – primarily surfing – and used cranes and other Hollywood trickery to portray them, the new movie eschewed all of that, including green screens, and relied on real life practical stunts. For the numerous stunts performed in the film, Core gathered a group of the best snowboarders, free rock climbers, big wave surfers, high-speed motocross riders and wingsuit pilots in the world and filmed them, essentially, as actors.

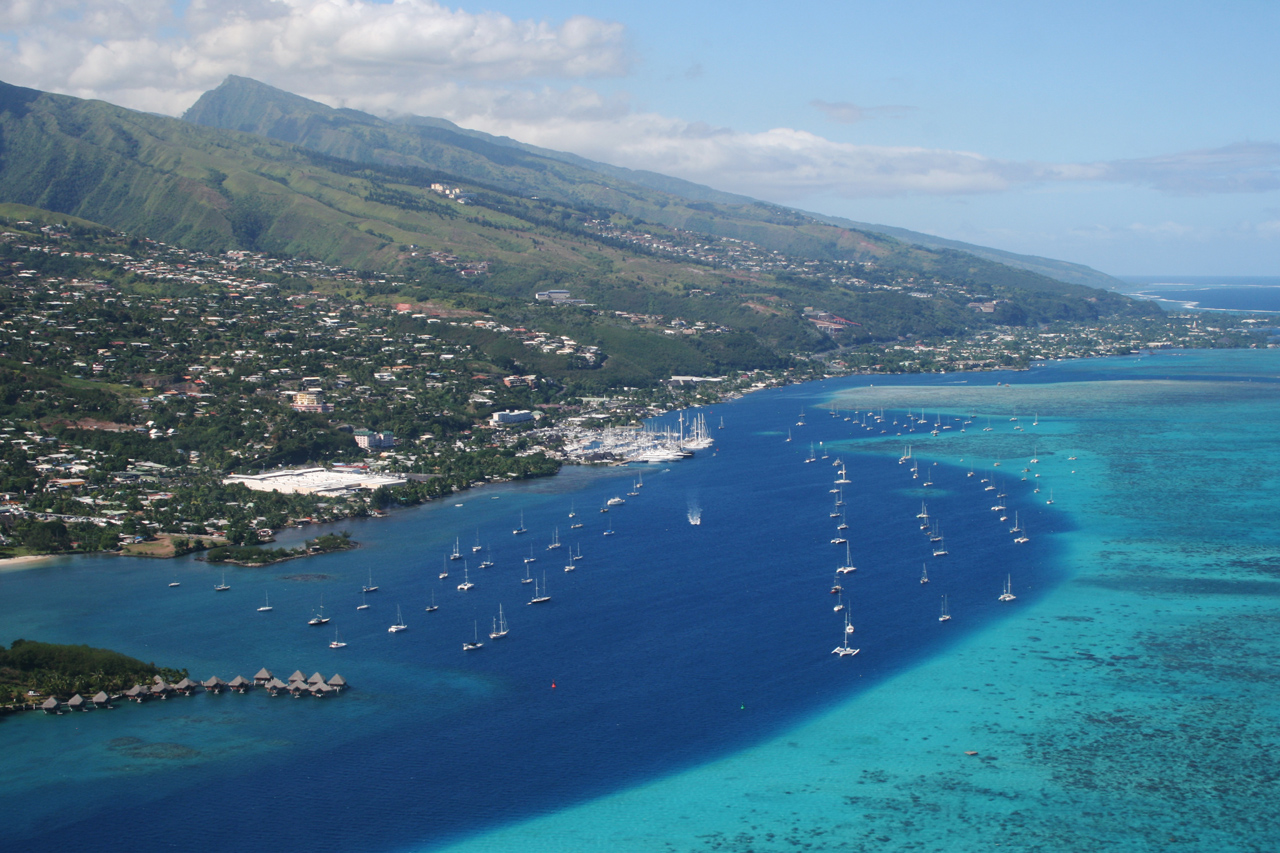
The surfing scene was shot at Teahupoʻo in Tahiti (pictured).

==== Surf sequence ====
Since surfing was central to the first movie, the filmmakers wanted to include it again, but at a higher level. Core and his team looked all over the world to try to find out where waves were going to hit, and when, before finally settling on Teahupoʻo in Tahiti. However, shooting the scene proved to be challenging since enormous, surfable waves are rare and unpredictable. A set of crew first went to Jaws, a surf break in Maui, months before principal photography began on the film. The team had to wait several days in Teahupoʻo for the waves to swell. Luckily, enormous swells arrived. The crew ran nine cameras in the water, on cliffs and on helicopters to capture the action in January 2014. Laird Hamilton, a pioneering big-wave surfer, who also played a minor role in the film, contributed his skills to the shoot. Additionally, Ian Walsh, a surfer from Maui and Billy Kemper, Makua Rothman, Ahani Tsondru all served as stunt doubles.

Australian surfer Laurie Towner, who was hired as the stunt double for lead character Johnny Utah, broke his jaw and suffered other injuries during stunt surfing in Teahupoʻo for the film, in mid-September 2014.

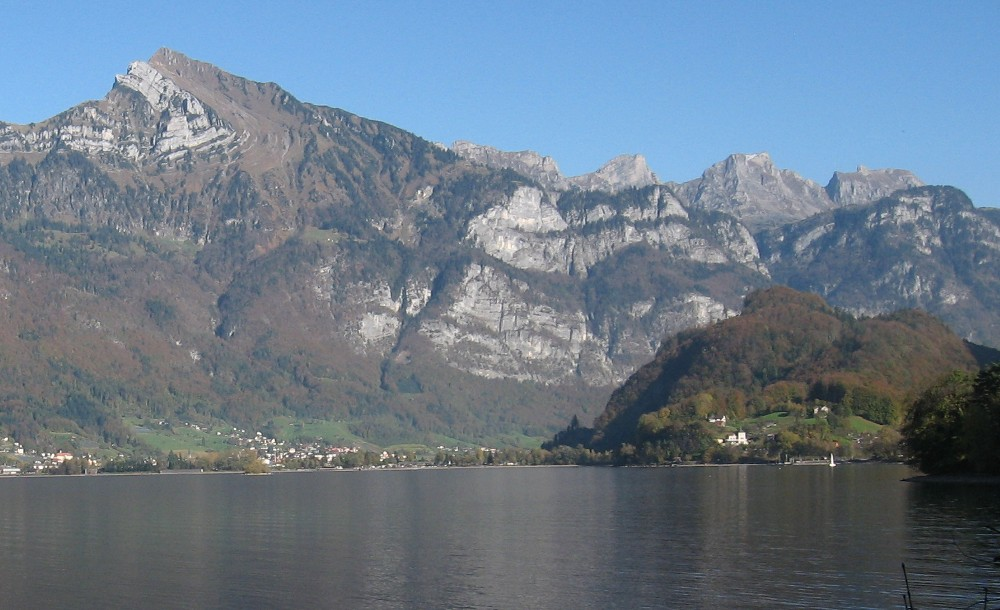
The wingsuit flying and BASE jumping sequence was filmed at Walenstadt in Switzerland.

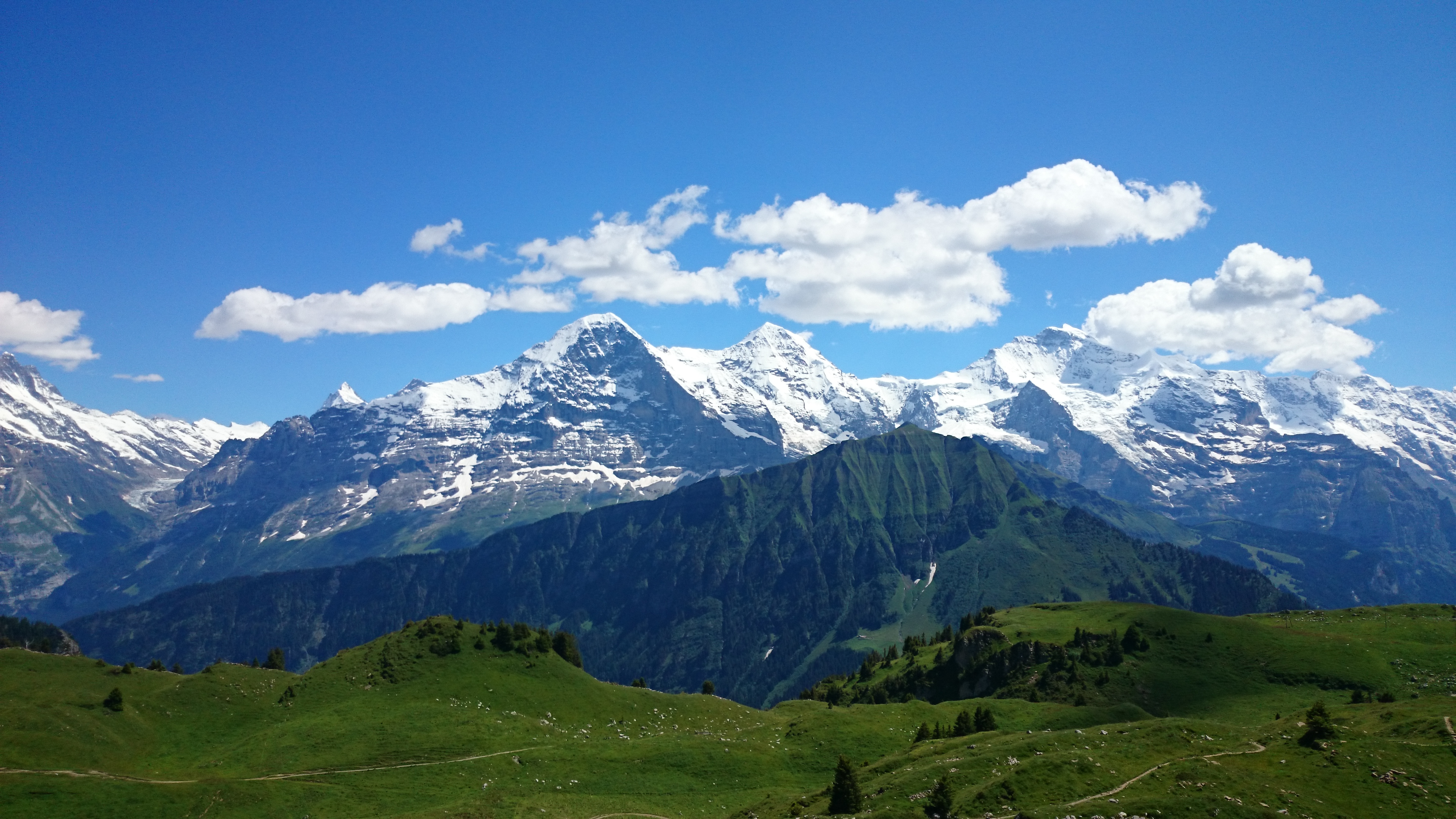
Additional filming also took place in Jungfrau in the Swiss Alps.

==== Wingsuit sequence ====
The wingsuit flying sequence which is notably the most dangerous stunt in the film was filmed in Walenstadt, Switzerland and required five stuntmen (including the cameraman) flying in formation, while all weaved through narrow mountain passes, one of which is called "The Crack", all at a speed of over 145 miles per hour (233 km/h). The production canceled planned flights on a number of days because of poor weather conditions, eventually completing it only after two weeks in August 2014. Core brought in Jeb Corliss, a professional sky diver, to help coordinate the scene and handpick wingsuit athletes to perform the stunt. Corliss and his team picked the best wingsuit pilots in the world, who have all made over 17,000 sky dives and have had 20 years of experience, including one thousand BASE jumps and thousands of wingsuit jumps each, to perform the jump. Corliss himself was going to be one of the fliers, but was not able to be, because he was recovering from a knee surgery after he tore his anterior cruciate ligament prior to the filming, while testing a suit. The five fliers includes two times World Wingsuit League champion and four times Guinness World Records holder Jhonathan Florez (cameraman, who died in July 2015), Red Bull Air Force former manager Jon DeVore (portrayed Utah), who previously worked on the wingsuit sequence for Transformers: Dark of the Moon, and served as the aerial coordinator, Mike Swanson (Bodhi), Julian Boulle (Grommet), Noah Bahnson (Roach), and James Boole. DeVore knew that the sequence was going to be difficult to enact, especially in supertight, choreographed formations. Corliss himself was familiar with the place since he made a jump in 2011 from a peak just outside the Swiss town. A video of the jump titled "Grinding the Crack" uploaded to YouTube has been watched over 30 million times.

However, performing such a sequence proved to be very dangerous. If one person crashes with the other, it could lead to the disproportion of the flight pattern and subsequently could result in death. Due to this, safety became a top priority for Core. Prior to shooting, the stuntmen went to the location, and to other locations which were similar, to start training in groups. In order to get comfortable with the wingtip-to-wingtip flights necessary to pull the scene off, the wingsuiters initially jumped from planes, racking up more than 500 jumps over the course of the year leading up to filming. They would fly in tight formations over and over again, simply as a way of getting accustomed to the idea of having someone nearby at all times. The production team also went to Switzerland 12 days prior to shooting to practice.

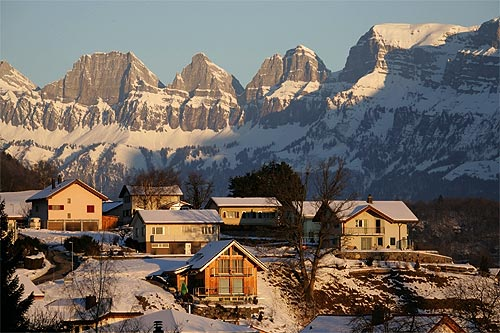
The jump was made from Hinterrugg Mountain, the highest peak in the Churfirsten range (on the right).

During the shoot, there were ground-based cameras with long lenses, and a helicopter with a gyro-stabilized camera as well. Since Core needed a series of shots to create the sequence, from point of view shots to profile shots of the wingsuiters cruising past the mountain to close-ups – unlike filming GoPro cameras – one of the wingsuiters needed to wear a cinema-quality camera on his head, rather than a GoPro. The task went to Florez and Boole, who had never done camera work before. The Red camera used in the flights weighed 15 pounds (6,8 kg), enough to significantly alter the way pilots normally flew. The wingsuiters made over 60 jumps in the course of two weeks to get all the shots. Corliss called it the most dangerous stunt that has ever been filmed for a movie.

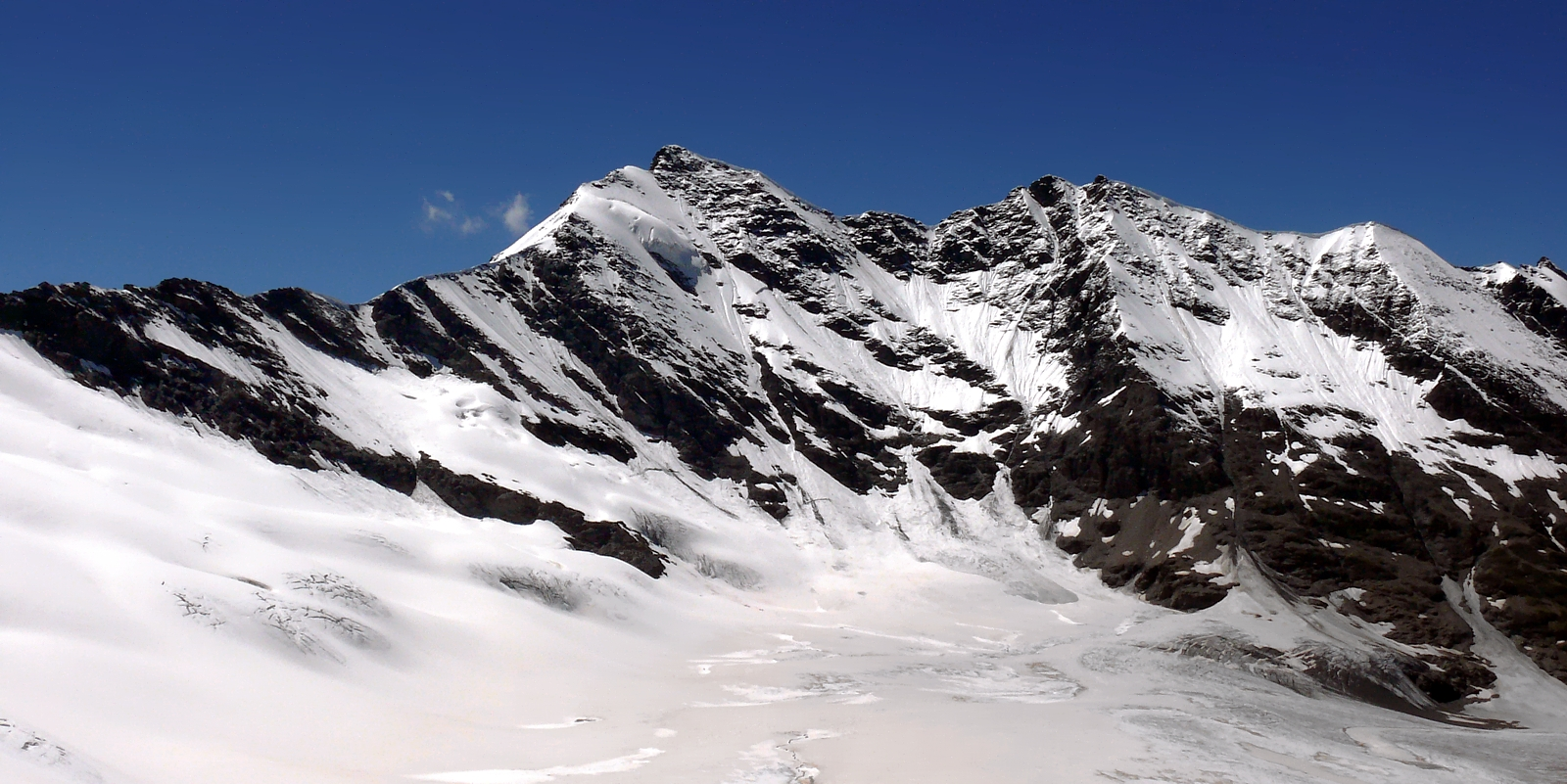
Aiguille de la Grande Sassière in France, where the snowboarding scene was filmed.

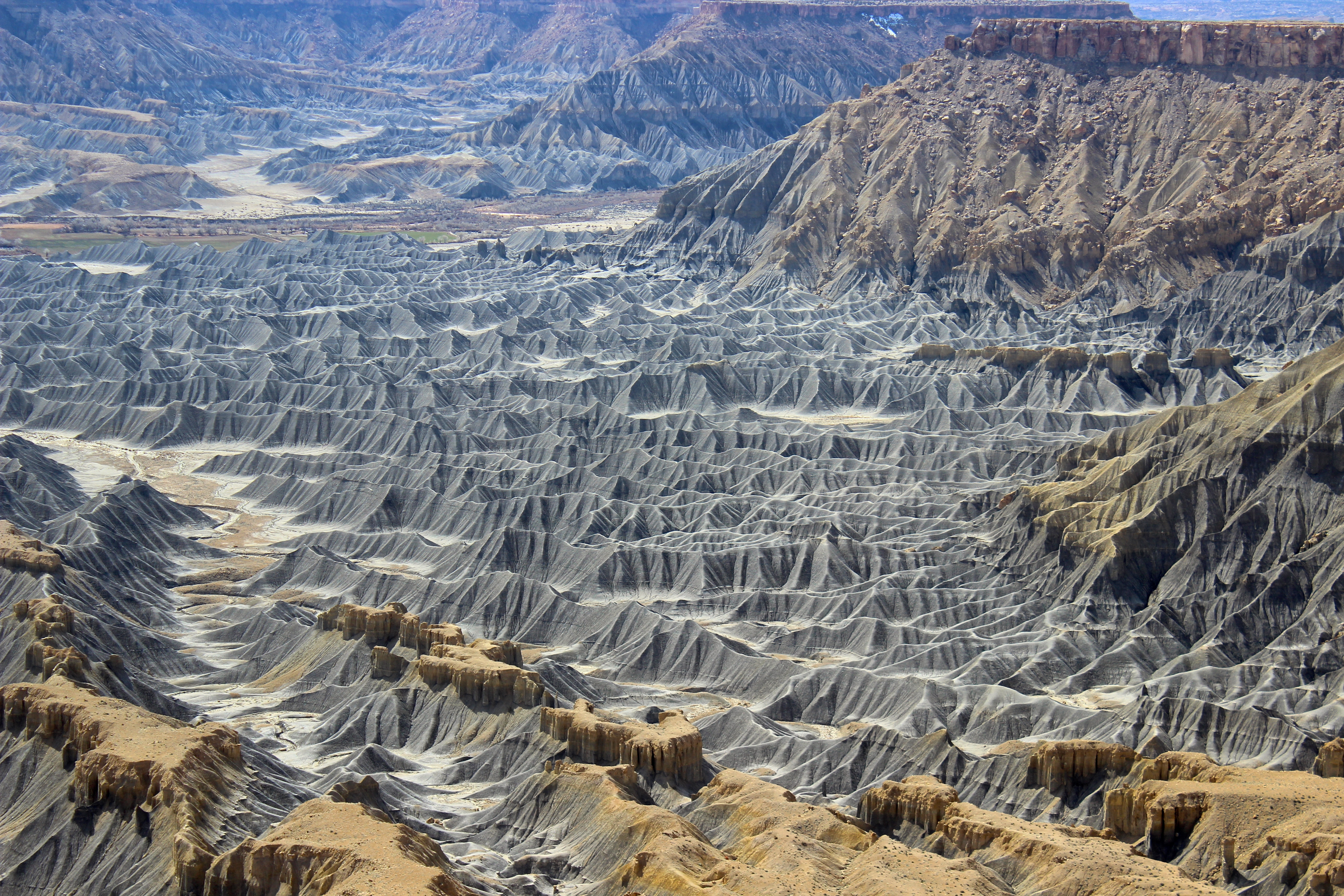
Caineville, Utah, where the motocross scene was filmed.

==== Snowboarding sequence ====
For the snowboarding scene, which was shot in the Italian side of Aiguille de la Grande Sassière in Aosta Valley, professional snowboarders Xavier de Le Rue and Jeremy Jones, along with Ralph Backstrom and Mike Basich, were hired to play stunt doubles. There were daily avalanche checks during the shoot, and a significant amount of time was spent sitting and waiting for the right conditions to film. For this scene, Core and members of his crew roped down cliffs to record the snowboarders from the best possible angles. At some point, Core had to give Xavier the camera and he had to shoot other people. He admitted that because Rue and Jones were so fast, few could keep up with them. During filming a particular sequence, a Class 4 avalanche was triggered.

==== Rock climbing sequence ====
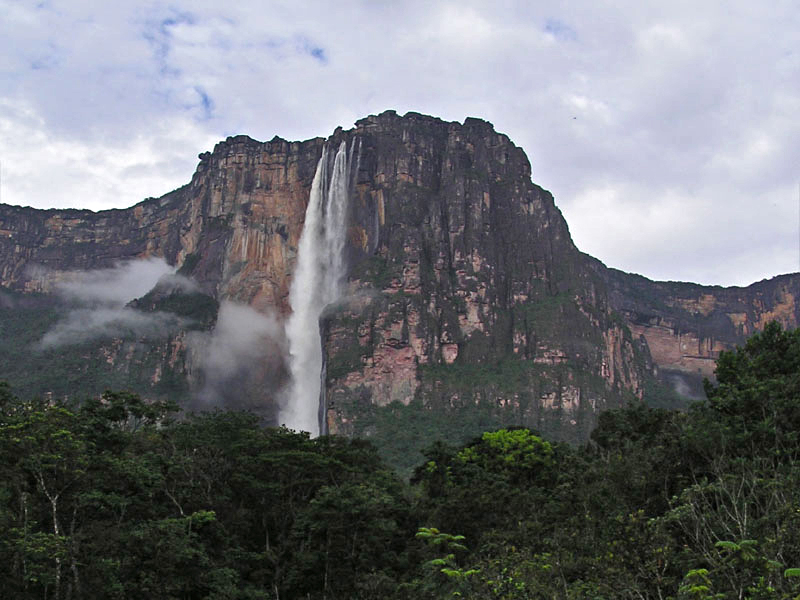
Angel Falls in Venezuela, where the free climbing scene was shot. Climbing took place on sites both beside the falls and above the rim.

For the rock climbing sequence, the cast and crew travelled to Angel Falls in Venezuela, where they set up three camps; one base was below the falls; one was on the rim; and one was high on the tepui. The film crew had to land on a small island at the head of the Churún River that had no vehicles, then move the equipment by motorized canoes to the falls by negotiating with a local general for a helicopter to get them and several tons of equipment out. Core hired Linh Nguyen, a longtime Southern California climber and former climbing consultant to a TV sports series, who Core described as his "oldest friend", as the Climbing Unit Supervisor. That site was near an overhanging 100-foot (30 m) boulder that the longtime climber-rigger Dave Schultz had picked out during scouting, as an ideal site for close-up "studio" climbing shots. Filming also took place on the wall beside the waterfall. Chris Sharma served as a stunt double for Johnny Utah, whereas Teresa Palmer was filmed in a climbing scene separately in the Alps. Dani Andrada of Spain played the stunt double for Bodhi, and climber-filmmaker Mike Call was second-unit cameraman. Peter Croft, a well-known Canadian climber and soloist, was hired as a backup climber and a stunt rigger, and to help lend credibility to the free-soloing scenes. He and Nguyen read the script together, taking notes and suggesting changes in dialogue. Others in the unit were Schultz (head rigger), Aaron Walters, Brooke Sandahl, Alexander Magerl and Ralf Haeger of Germany, Emiliyan Kolevski of Bulgaria, and Alberto Roha and other climbers from Venezuela. For soloing shots, the climbers were tied into thin Spectra line that could be digitized out. All bolts used in the filming were removed afterwards.

==== Jumping sequences ====
On several European jumping scenes, Core, who also previously trained as a mountain ranger, would hike up with a small crew and wait hours for safe conditions. Kosove said the movie "was more of an expedition than a production."

== Release ==
The film was initially slated for an August 7, 2015 release, but on August 12, 2014, Warner Bros. brought the date forward to July 31, 2015. On February 3, 2015, the release date was moved back to December 25, 2015. Warner Bros. Pictures distributed the film in North America, the United Kingdom, Ireland, the CIS, Japan and Latin America, and Lionsgate handled the film's international sales outside of China. DMG Entertainment, which collaborated with Alcon Entertainment to finance and develop the remake, distributed the film in China through China Film Group Corporation, where it was released on December 4, 2015.

== Soundtrack ==
1. "Runaway" – Andrew Watt
2. "Burn Me Down" – Justin Young
3. "I Need Your Love" – Gareth Thomas (feat. BAER)
4. "I See" – Sempe (feat. Zoey Clarke)
5. "Do You Wanna" – MRKTS
6. "AAA" – Sempe
7. "The Power of Now" – Steve Aoki & Headhunterz
8. "Crazy (Jamie Jones Remix)" – Art Department
9. "Warm" – SG Lewis
10. "Take Me Down" – Genevieve
11. "Fade Out Lines (The Avener Rework)" – Phoebe Killdeer & The Avener
12. "Still Breathing" – Dig The Kid
13. "Point Break End Credits" – Tom Holkenborg (aka Junkie XL)

== Reception ==
=== Box office ===
Point Break has grossed $28.8 million in North America and $104.9 million in other territories, for a worldwide total of $133.7 million, against a budget of $105 million. In the United States and Canada, the film opened on the same day as Daddy's Home, Joy and Concussion, and earned $4.1 million on its opening day. In its opening weekend, it earned $9.8 million from 2,910 theaters, finishing 8th at the box office, and last among new releases.

Point Break was released across 3,700 screens in China, its first market, on December 4, three weeks prior to its U.S. release. It earned $12.1 million in its opening weekend and $22.7 million in its first full week, fending off local newcomer Fall in Love Like a Star, but debuted behind The Martian, which was on its second weekend of play. Alcon Entertainment's Andrew Kosove said they were happy with the results given the lack of brand equity associated with the film there. Including revenues from five other Asian markets, the total opening was $14.1 million. Buoyed by good word of mouth, the film fell only 14% in its second weekend to $10.2 million ($18.8 million in its full second week), which is the lowest second weekend drop of any film in China of 2015. It was finally overtaken by Chinese films Mojin: The Lost Legend and Surprise in its third weekend. As of December 2015, it has grossed a total of $39.4 million in China.

In other markets worldwide, it opened with $1.8 million in Russia and the CIS, $1.6 million in France, $1.5 million in Australia, $1.5 million from 421 screens in Italy where it debuted at No. 3 behind Universal's local film L'Abbiamo Fatta Grossa and Fox's The Revenant, and $1.3 million in Japan. In the United Kingdom and Ireland, it posted an opening weekend of just £421,818 ($610,421) from 364 screens debuted at third place among newly releases, behind Goosebumps and Dad's Army and in ninth place overall. In comparison, the original Point Break debuted with £777,000 ($1.12 million) from 273 screens back in November 1991, eventually reaching just over £4 million ($5.78 million). Warner Bros. portion of the total is $21.4 million in 11 markets while Lionsgate total is $74.5 million.

=== Critical reception ===
On review aggregator website Rotten Tomatoes, the film has an approval rating of 11% based on 115 reviews. The site's critical consensus reads, "Loaded with dazzling action but bereft of purpose, the Point Break remake will be remembered as the first film to make audiences pine for the simultaneous presences of Keanu Reeves and Gary Busey." On Metacritic, the film has a weighted average score of 34 out of 100, based on 21 critics, indicating "generally unfavorable reviews". Audiences polled by CinemaScore gave the film an average grade of "B" on an A+ to F scale.

Maggie Lee of Variety called the film "a visual dazzler and a dramatic non-starter." Elizabeth Kerr of The Hollywood Reporter called the film "a thrill ride in need of a few more thrills." Norl Murray of the Los Angeles Times remarked that "while Bigelow's version featured charismatic lead performances and ample pop, Core's cast mumbles slowly and sparingly at one another until it's time to jump off something." The A.V. Club's Ignatiy Vishnevetsky said: "Boldly reimagining Kathryn Bigelow's cult favorite as a movie where absolutely nobody seems to be having any fun, the new Point Break drops the original's Zen-like balance of macho mysticism and camp in favor of dour humorlessness."

=== Accolades ===
Award	Category	Recipient	Result	Ref.
Teen Choice Awards	Choice Movie: Drama	Point Break	Nominated	
