= Father Figures =

- Theatrical release poster
- Directed by: Lawrence Sher
- Written by: Justin Malen
- Produced by: Ivan Reitman; Ali Bell; Broderick Johnson; Andrew A. Kosove
- Starring: Owen Wilson; Ed Helms; J. K. Simmons; Katt Williams; Terry Bradshaw; Ving Rhames; Harry Shearer; June Squibb; Christopher Walken; Glenn Close
- Cinematography: John Lindley
- Edited by: Dana E. Glauberman
- Music by: Rob Simonsen
- Production companies: Alcon Entertainment; The Montecito Picture Company; DMG Entertainment
- Distributed by: Warner Bros. Pictures
- Release dates: December 13, 2017 (TCL Chinese Theater); December 22, 2017 (United States)
- Running time: 113 minutes
- Country: United States
- Language: English
- Budget: $25 million
- Box office: $25.7 million

Father Figures (known as Who's Your Daddy? in the United Kingdom) is a 2017 American comedy film directed by Lawrence Sher (in his directorial debut), written by Justin Malen, and starring Owen Wilson, Ed Helms, J. K. Simmons, Katt Williams, Terry Bradshaw, Ving Rhames, June Squibb, Christopher Walken, and Glenn Close with supporting roles by Harry Shearer, Jack McGee, Ryan Cartwright, Ryan Gaul, Ali Wong, Retta, Jessica Gomes, and Katie Aselton. The film follows two adult brothers who set out to find their biological father by encountering the men that their mother used to date.

Principal photography began on October 5, 2015, in Atlanta, and the film was released in the United States on December 22, 2017, by Warner Bros. Pictures. It was poorly received by critics, who called it devoid of "energy or purpose" and grossed $25.7 million against its $25 million budget.

== Plot ==
In Westerville, Ohio, Kyle and Peter Reynolds are fraternal twins who were raised by their mother Helen, as their father died before they were born. Kyle is dating his pregnant girlfriend Kaylani and is wealthy from royalties for his image on BBQ sauce labels. Peter is a divorced proctologist with a teenage son Ethan who resents him.

Shortly after Helen's wedding to Gene, Peter recognizes an actor on Law and Order: SVU from photos of their supposed father and confronts Helen. She explains that she had been promiscuous at the time of their conception, and did not want their father involved. When they keep pressing, Helen reveals that their father is Terry Bradshaw.

The brothers fly to Miami to meet Bradshaw, who they encounter at a signing event. He is excited to have them as sons. As Bradshaw recounts stories with former teammate Rod Hamilton, they realize he had been in Australia at the time of their conception (a trip Helen had backed out of at the last minute) and thus cannot be their father. Bradshaw points out that Roland Hunt, a New York investor, dated Helen after him.

As they travel north after contacting Helen about him, Kyle finds that his BBQ sauce royalties deal is ending. Arriving at what they assumed was Hunt's office, they find a closed-up house. Hunt confronts them at gunpoint until they reveal why they were looking for him. He invites them inside, but expresses his dissatisfaction at having children in front of his mother. As the brothers prepare to depart, they offer to help Roland with his repossession service.

However, the brothers realize Hunt is a criminal when he breaks into a Ferrari, then slips away. As they argue with the owners of the car, Hunt flees only to feel remorse for abandoning his sons. The brothers jump into the Ferrari and hit Hunt who was returning to them. At the hospital, the brothers find out their blood type is incompatible with Hunt's when they try to give him a transfusion, so realize he cannot be their father. He also realizes that he was in prison at the time of their conception, but directs them to find another ex-boyfriend of Helen known as Sparkly P.

Unable to find Sparkly P, the brothers start driving home. Along the way, they pick up a hitchhiker who provides advice as they travel. After accidentally parking on railroad tracks, Peter and the hitchhiker narrowly escape getting hit by a train, while Kyle is stuck in the car and presumably killed.

Initially devastated, Peter is surprised to see Kyle walk away from the car, only to be punched by him for abandoning him. As they are being treated, police officers recognize the name Sparkly P as a sting alias of Patrick O'Callaghan, a retired police officer in Worcester, Massachusetts. After dropping off the hitchhiker with his family in the same location, the brothers stop at a hotel where Peter falls for a girl named Sarah and has a one-night-stand.

The brothers arrive at the house where there is a wake for Patrick. His daughter is invited to speak and Peter realizes that it is Sarah, their possible half-sister. Appalled, Peter runs out of the wake. Patrick's identical twin brother Kevin clears things up by saying that Patrick cannot be the father as he did not believe in premarital sex. He then directs them to the next of Helen's ex-boyfriends, Dr. Walter Tinkler. The brothers recall that Dr. Tinkler is a family friend and veterinarian in their home town.

Returning home, Kyle and Peter confront Dr. Tinkler in his office. After being called down, Helen arrives and reveals that she is not their biological mother. She and Dr. Tinkler had been working at a women's shelter when their actual mother came in and gave birth to them. She then died during childbirth and Helen chose to adopt Kyle and Peter instead of having them separated by social services. She also reveals she never knew their father at all. The brothers are happy to have learned their history.

One year later, Kyle, Peter, and Helen are on vacation in Maui. Peter is now dating Sarah and Ethan respects him. Kyle and Kaylani have twin daughters. The brothers have gone into business together and created an app that provides positive advice from the universe spoken by the hitchhiker.

== Cast ==
- Owen Wilson as Kyle Reynolds, Peter's fraternal twin brother. A laid-back model who made millions by selling his image to a BBQ sauce company, he is resented by Peter for his life being so easy.
- Ed Helms as Peter Reynolds, Kyle's fraternal twin brother and a proctologist. He is divorced and facing a mid-life crisis because his teenage son Ethan hates him. Having never known his own father, Peter is unsure of how to deal with his son, inspiring him to attempt to find his biological father.
- Glenn Close as Helen Baxter, Kyle and Peter's eccentric mother who is revealed to have been heavily sexually active in the mid-1970s and appears not to know who the twins' biological father is.
  - Annie Starke as young Helen Baxter
- Christopher Walken as Dr. Walter Tinkler, a veterinarian and family friend who is one of the potential fathers of Kyle and Peter.
- J. K. Simmons as Roland Hunt, a former financial investor in New York, reclusive criminal, and one of the potential fathers of Kyle and Peter.
- Katt Williams as an unnamed hitchhiker who Kyle and Peter meet on their journey.
- Terry Bradshaw as himself, a retired football player and one of the potential fathers of Kyle and Peter.
- Ving Rhames as Rod Hamilton, a retired football player and friend/ex-teammate of Bradshaw.
- Harry Shearer as Gene, Helen's new husband.
- June Squibb as Mrs. Hunt, Roland Hunt's mother.
- Jack McGee as Patrick "Sparkly P" O'Callaghan, a retired police officer in Worcester, Massachusetts and one of the potential fathers of Kyle and Peter who was dead before Kyle and Peter arrived.
  - Jack McGee also portrays Kevin O'Callaghan, Patrick's twin brother.
- Ryan Cartwright as Liam O'Callaghan, one of Patrick's sons.
- Ryan Gaul as Sean O'Callaghan, one of Patrick's sons who is not very bright.
- Ali Wong as Ali, Dr. Tinkler's nurse.
- Retta as Annie, Helen and Gene's wedding planner.
- Jessica Gomes as Kaylani Reynolds, Kyle's girlfriend later wife.
- Katie Aselton as Sarah O'Callaghan, the daughter of Patrick, niece of Kevin, and sister of Sean and Liam.
- Zachary Haven as Ethan, Peter's teenage son who hates him.
- Mary Grill as Katherine, Peter's ex-wife and Ethan's mother.
- Debra Stipe as Karen Bradshaw, the wife of Terry Bradshaw.
- Robert Walker Branchaud and B'nard Lewis as the police officers who direct Kyle and Peter to where Patrick lives.
- Andrew Wilson as a quiet-talking hotel desk clerk
- Taylor Treadwell as Kelly, the girlfriend of Liam.
- Jim France as Father McManus, a priest who presides over Patrick's wake
- Brian Huskey as Joel (uncredited)

== Production ==
On June 14, 2011, it was announced that Paramount Pictures had acquired the rights to the comedy spec script Bastards, written by Justin Malen. The story is about two brothers who learn their father did not die when they were young. The Montecito Picture Company was set to produce the film, and on August 7, 2014, Alcon Entertainment also came on board to produce and finance the film, for Warner Bros., after Paramount left the project and the script went into turnaround. Cinematographer Lawrence Sher was attached to make his directorial debut, and Ivan Reitman, Tom Pollock, and Ali Bell produced the film through Montecito.

Jason Sudeikis was originally attached to star. On July 15, 2015, Owen Wilson and Ed Helms were cast to play the brothers, while Broderick Johnson and Andrew Kosove were also set to produce the film, through Alcon. J. K. Simmons and Terry Bradshaw also joined the cast on August 13, 2015, to play the lead characters' potential biological fathers, with Bradshaw playing himself. On August 18, 2015, Ving Rhames signed on to play Rod Hamilton, a friend and ex-teammate of football player Bradshaw. On September 11, 2015, Katt Williams joined the cast, on September 17, 2015, Glenn Close was in final negotiations to join the film, and on October 7, 2015, Katie Aselton was also in final talks to sign on. On October 22, 2015, Zachary Haven also joined the cast.

=== Filming ===
Principal photography on the film began on October 5, 2015, in Atlanta, Georgia. Filming also took place in Miami, and wrapped on December 5, 2015.

After poor test screenings, the film's initial ending was reshot to make it funnier and more consistent with the rest of the film. The reshoots took place in Rutledge, Georgia in April 2017. The reshoots also included a scene involving Owen Wilson's character Kyle being chased by a field hockey team, though this was only seen in trailers and not included in the final film.

Despite high scores from test audiences after the reshoots (which also removed Bill Irwin from the film as Doctor Tinkler and replaced him with Christopher Walken), the film still received negative reviews from critics and audiences upon its release.

== Release ==
Father Figures was originally scheduled to be released by Warner Bros. Pictures on November 4, 2016; it was later changed to January 27, 2017. In January 2017, weeks before the film's planned release, the film was removed from the schedule. It was later moved again to December 22, 2017.

On September 15, 2017, the film was renamed from Bastards to Father Figures. The title was changed because television advertisers would not play ads for the film with profanity in the title, as well as so that posters could be displayed in movie theaters.

=== Home media ===
Father Figures was released on Digital HD on March 20, 2018, with a Blu-ray and DVD released on April 3, 2018.

== Reception ==
=== Box office ===
Father Figures grossed $17.5 million in the United States and Canada, and $8.1 million in other territories, for a worldwide total of $25.6 million.

In the United States and Canada, Father Figures was released alongside the openings of Downsizing and Pitch Perfect 3, and the wide expansions of The Shape of Water and Darkest Hour, and was projected to gross around $10 million from 2,902 theaters in its opening weekend. It grossed $1.4 million on its first day and $3.2 million over the three-day weekend, finishing 9th at the box office. When factoring in inflation, it was the sixth-worst opening of all-time for a film playing in at least 2,500 theaters. Deadline Hollywood attributed the film's weak performance to audiences' diminished interest in R-rated comedies, the "been there, done that" plot line, and the possibility of outdated jokes, because the film was shot in 2015. The next weekend, the film grossed $3.8 million (an increase of 16%), finishing 10th.

=== Critical response ===
On the review aggregator website Rotten Tomatoes, 17% of 47 critics' reviews are positive, with an average rating of 3.5/10. The website's consensus reads: "Success has many fathers, but failure is Father Figures." Metacritic, which uses a weighted average, assigned the film a score of 22 out of 100, based on 17 critics, indicating "generally unfavorable" reviews. Audiences polled by CinemaScore gave the film an average grade of "B–" on an A+ to F scale, while social media monitor RelishMix noted online responses to the film were "leaning toward the negative".
