= Andrew Kosove =

American film producer

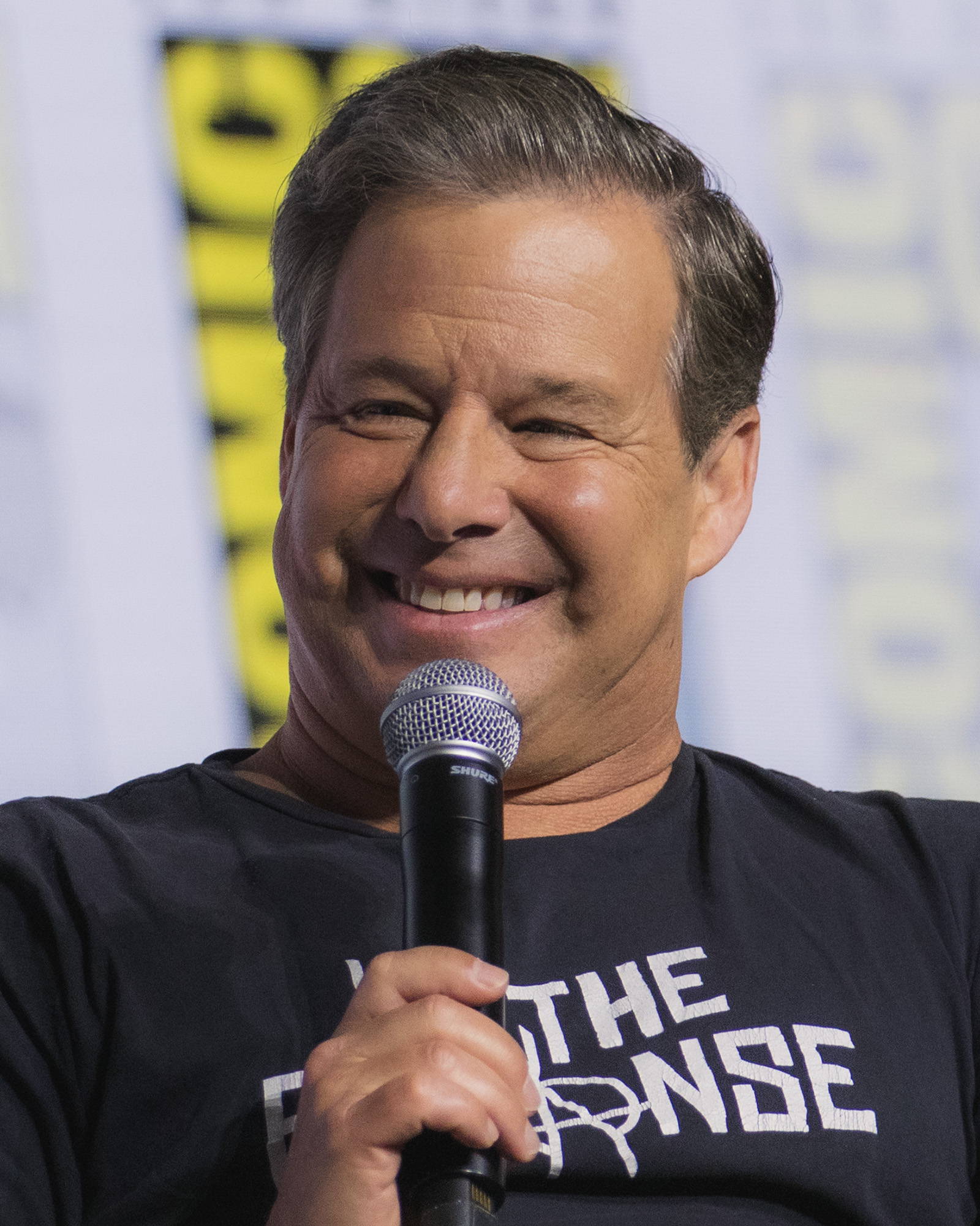
- Kosove at the 2026 San Diego Comic-Con
- Education: Princeton University
- Occupation: Film producer
- Spouse: Kira Davis
- Children: 2

Andrew A. Kosove is an American film and television producer who has been a producer or executive producer on 35 films. He was nominated for an Academy Award for the film The Blind Side. Alongside his producing partner, Broderick Johnson, he is the co-founder and co-CEO of Alcon Entertainment, a Los Angeles–based film and television production and financing company. Kosove is also an avid marathon runner and triathlete.

== Early life ==
Kosove graduated from Princeton University in 1992. He became friends with Broderick Johnson in college. He is of Jewish descent.

== Career ==
Kosove and Johnson moved to Los Angeles, California, where they started a film production company with financial capital from Frederick W. Smith, the founder and chairman of FedEx. The company became known as Alcon Entertainment. Their first feature film, Lost & Found, had limited box office returns, but their second film, My Dog Skip, cost only $7 million to produce and grossed $34M domestically. Alcon's other productions include P.S. I Love You, Dude, Where's My Car?, The Sisterhood of the Traveling Pants, The Book of Eli, Insomnia (the first studio distributed film for director Christopher Nolan), and Denis Villeneuve's Prisoners.

In 2009, Kosove and Johnson produced Alcon's The Blind Side, which became the highest grossing sports film of all time. The film was nominated for a Best Picture Oscar and earned Sandra Bullock the Academy Award for Best Actress. The following year, Alcon Entertainment produced and financed Dolphin Tale, another modestly budgeted family film that grossed $100M in worldwide box-office.

Kosove was nominated for an Emmy Award as an executive producer on the documentary, Sinatra: All or Nothing At All (directed by Alex Gibney) in 2015. He is also an executive producer of the sci-fi series, The Expanse.

== Personal life ==
Kosove lives in Los Angeles and is married to producer Kira Davis. They have two children together.

== Filmography ==
=== Film ===
Producer

- Love Is All There Is (1996) (co-producer)
- Lost & Found (1999)
- My Dog Skip (2000)
- Dude, Where's My Car? (2000)
- The Affair of the Necklace (2001)
- Insomnia (2002)
- Love Don't Cost a Thing (2003)
- Chasing Liberty (2004)
- Racing Stripes (2005)
- The Sisterhood of the Traveling Pants (2005)
- P.S. I Love You (2007)
- One Missed Call (2008)
- The Blind Side (2009)
- The Book of Eli (2010)
- Lottery Ticket (2010)
- Something Borrowed (2011)
- Dolphin Tale (2011)
- Joyful Noise (2012)
- Beautiful Creatures (2013)
- Prisoners (2013)
- Transcendence (2014)
- Dolphin Tale 2 (2014)
- Point Break (2015)
- Blade Runner 2049 (2017)
- Father Figures (2017)
- Just a Gigolo (2017) (Associate producer)
- Lullaby (2021)
- The Garfield Movie (2024)

Executive producer

- The Sisterhood of the Traveling Pants 2 (2008)
- Chernobyl Diaries (2012)
- The Good Lie (2014)
- No Manches Frida (2016)
- 12 Strong (2018)
- The Social Reckoning (2026)
- The Sisterhood of the Traveling Pants 3 (TBA)

Thanks

- Arrival (2016)

=== Television ===
Executive producer

- Hysteria (2014)
- Sinatra: All or Nothing at All (2015) (Documentary)
- Everest (2015)
- The Expanse (2015−2022)
- The Defiant Ones (2017) (Documentary)
- Pete the Cat (2017−2020)
- Nana (2019) (TV movie)
- Blade Runner: Black Lotus (2021)
- Blade Runner 2099 (2026)
