= Racing Stripes =

- Theatrical release poster
- Directed by: Frederik Du Chau
- Screenplay by: David Schmidt
- Story by: David Schmidt; Steven P. Wegner; Kirk DeMicco; Frederik Du Chau
- Produced by: Andrew Kosove; Broderick Johnson; Lloyd Phillips; Edward L. McDonnell
- Starring: Frankie Muniz; Bruce Greenwood; Hayden Panettiere; M. Emmet Walsh; Wendie Malick; Mandy Moore; Michael Clarke Duncan; Jeff Foxworthy; Joshua Jackson; Joe Pantoliano; Michael Rosenbaum; Steve Harvey; David Spade; Snoop Dogg; Fred Dalton Thompson; Dustin Hoffman; Whoopi Goldberg
- Cinematography: David Eggby
- Edited by: Tom Finan
- Music by: Mark Isham
- Production company: Alcon Entertainment
- Distributed by: Warner Bros. Pictures (United States and Canada); Summit Entertainment (International)
- Release dates: January 8, 2005 (Hollywood); January 14, 2005 (United States)
- Running time: 102 minutes
- Country: United States
- Language: English
- Budget: $30 million
- Box office: $90.8 million

Racing Stripes is a 2005 American sports comedy family film directed by Frederik Du Chau. The film was produced by Andrew A. Kosove, Broderick Johnson, Lloyd Phillips and Edward L. McDonnell, and written by David Schmidt, from a story by Schmidt, Steven P. Wegner, Kirk DeMicco and Du Chau. The film tells the story of Stripes, a circus zebra who is accidentally abandoned in Kentucky and raised on a farm next to a racetrack. Believing he is a racehorse, Stripes dreams of training for and competing in a horse race.

The film stars Hayden Panettiere, Bruce Greenwood, Wendie Malick and M. Emmet Walsh, with the voice talents of Frankie Muniz, Mandy Moore, Michael Clarke Duncan, Jeff Foxworthy, Joshua Jackson, Joe Pantoliano, Michael Rosenbaum, Steve Harvey, David Spade, Snoop Dogg, Fred Dalton Thompson, Dustin Hoffman and Whoopi Goldberg. Racing Stripes was released theatrically on January 14, 2005, by Warner Bros. Pictures, received mixed reviews from critics and grossed $90 million worldwide.

== Plot ==
During a thunderstorm, a traveling circus, Circus Sarano, inadvertently abandons a young plains zebra after replacing a flat tire. The foal is rescued by Nolan Walsh, a Kentucky widower and former racehorse trainer, and taken to his farm, where he is named "Stripes" by Nolan's teenage daughter Channing and meets a Shetland pony named Tucker, a goat named Franny, and a rooster named Reggie. The next day, Stripes becomes convinced that he is destined for the nearby racetrack, Turfway Park, unaware that he is a zebra and is not qualified. A pair of thoroughbred foals named Trenton's Pride and Ruffshodd challenge Stripes to a race, only to be stopped by Pride's strict father, Sir Trenton.

Three years later, after losing to the mailman in their race, an adult Stripes meets an Arabian filly named Sandy and develops a crush on her. Stripes is then approached by Pride, Ruffshodd, and Sir Trenton, and Pride challenges him to a race at a secret racetrack in the forest called the Blue Moon Races, which Stripes ends up losing. The following day, Tucker, having watched Stripes in secret, approaches him and suggests that he gets proper training first. Stripes chooses Channing for his rider and convinces a pelican named Goose to sabotage Channing's motorcycle and 'Old Blue', Nolan's old pickup truck, so that Channing can ride him to her workplace at Turfway Park. The plan works, and Channing rides Stripes to Turfway Park with Nolan's reluctant approval. There, Channing is chastised by her boss, Clara Dalrymple, for bringing Stripes to the racetrack, while Stripes himself meets a pair of horsefly brothers named Buzz and Scuzz.

At night, Channing, remembering her first horseback ride with her late mother Carolyn, completes a lap around the track with Stripes. They are approached by Woodzie, a racetrack gambler and old friend of the family, who encourages Channing to sign herself and Stripes up for a tryout race the next day. She agrees, despite Nolan's disapproval stemming from Carolyn's death in an accident years ago, which discouraged him from horse-training, but Stripes gets scared by the starting gate and gets hit by flying dirt while running, causing Channing to fall off. Although she is uninjured, Nolan chastises Channing, but he defends her when Clara ridicules Channing's riding skills. Clara responds by sarcastically signing Stripes up to compete in the Kentucky Open.

Meanwhile, Stripes finally realizes that he is a zebra after being told off by Sir Trenton, which severely discourages him. Despite Channing's pleas and Woodzie's encouragement, Nolan refuses to let his daughter race Stripes. Realizing this, the farm animals lure Nolan into the barn to show him a table with pictures of his past accomplishments, and he changes his mind. The following day, due to Stripes' misbehavior during training, Franny reveals to Stripes that Tucker helped Nolan train many racehorses, including Sir Trenton, without getting any thanks, which encourages him to begin training.

Refusing to let Stripes race, however, Sir Trenton and several thoroughbreds ambush him and Sandy at a creek at night while they are making up for their previous argument, and they kidnap Sandy, intent on hurting her if Stripes races, and knock the latter unconscious. The next day, after finding Stripes and waking him up, Tucker, Franny and Goose agree to rescue Sandy for him. With help from Buzz and Scuzz, they succeed in doing so and return in time for Stripes to go to the race.

At the race, Nolan makes a deal with Clara that he will buy Sandy if Stripes wins, but will come back to work for her if he does not. During the race, Ruffshodd and his own jockey attempt to stop Stripes and Channing, but Scuzz gets them disqualified by biting Ruffshodd's rear end. Later, Stripes starts wearing out, until he finally remembers Tucker's advice: "Don't look back. Leave it all on the track", which boosts his confidence. Stripes wins the race in a photo finish and earns his respect from Pride and the other horses. In the end, they all come together in a group photo, which is later shown with the past Walsh wins.

== Cast ==
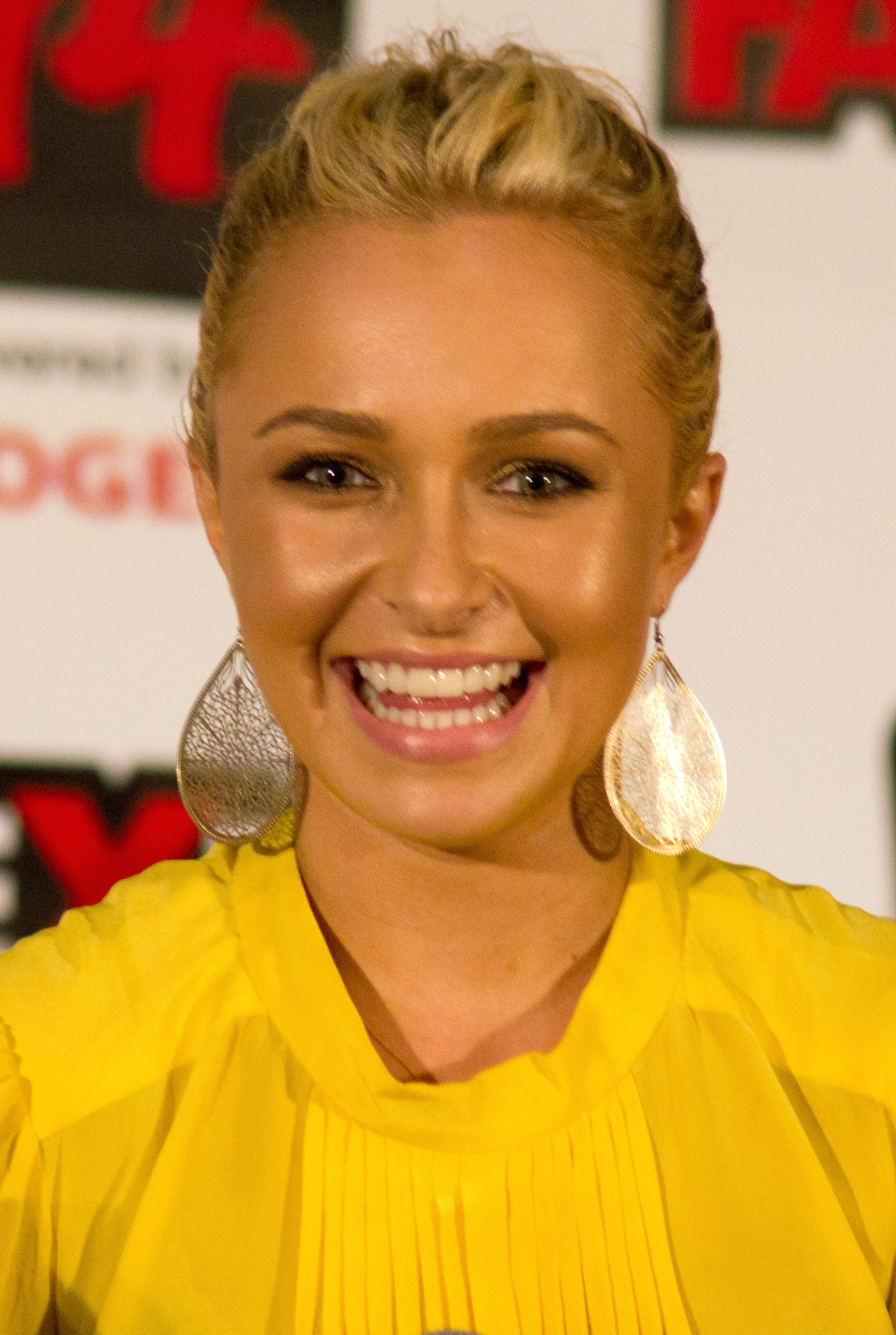
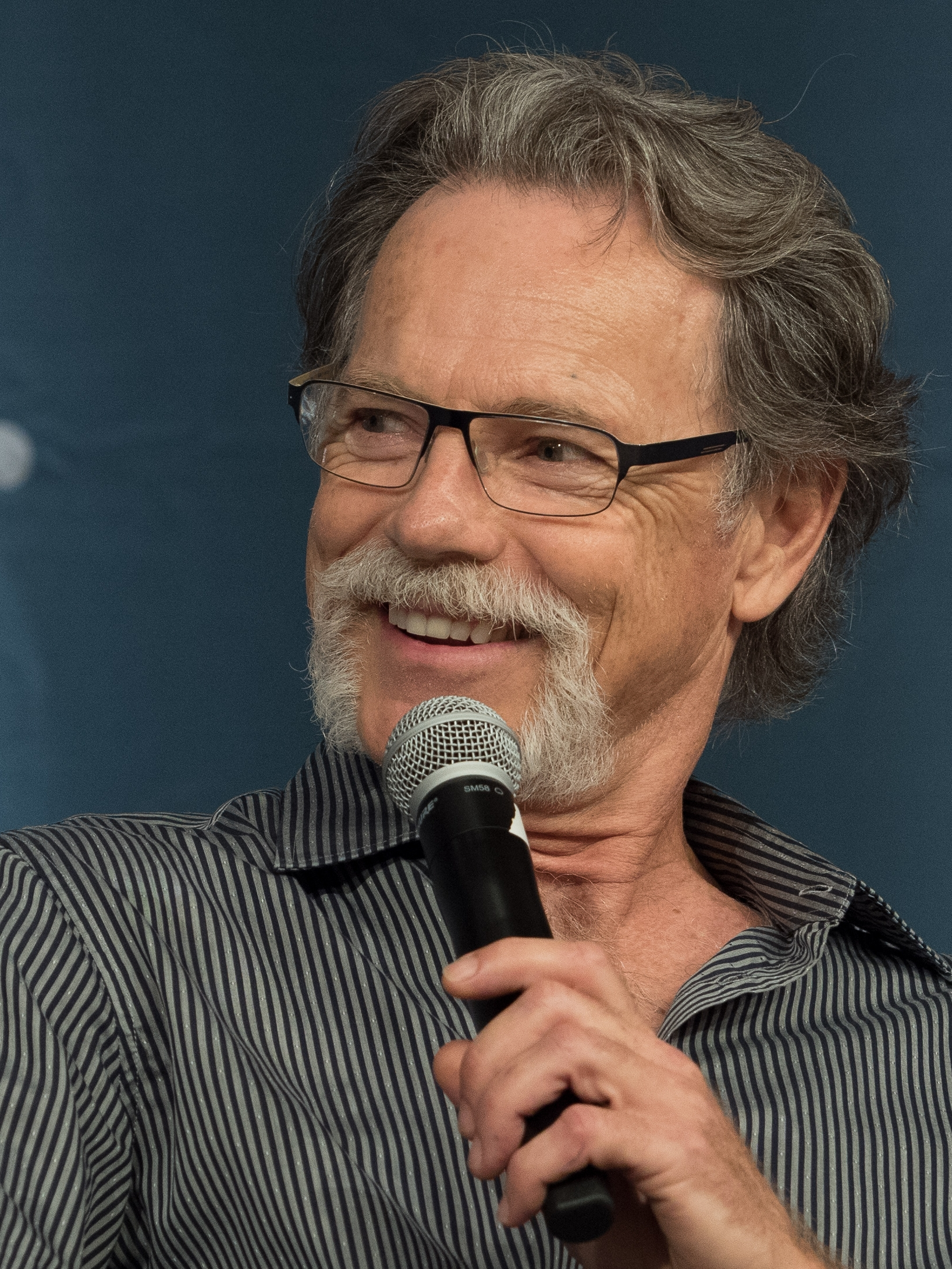
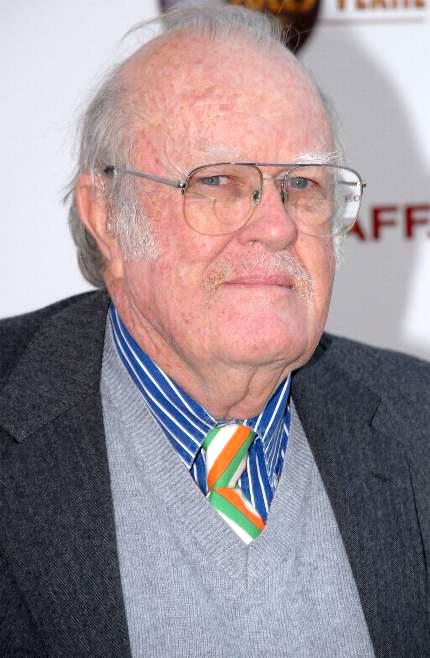
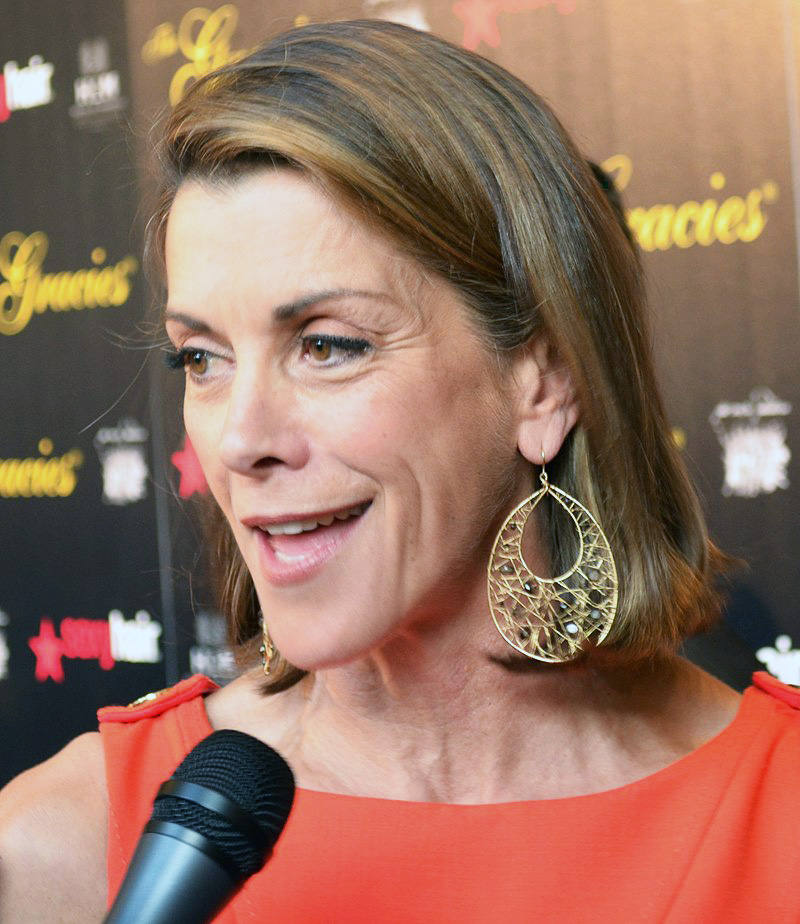
Hayden Panettiere (left), Bruce Greenwood, M. Emmet Walsh and Wendie Malick play Channing Walsh, Nolan Walsh, Sheriff Woodzie and Clara Dalrymple.
- Hayden Panettiere as Channing "Chan" Walsh, Nolan's free-spirited teenage daughter.
- Bruce Greenwood as Nolan "The Chief" Walsh, Channing's widowed father, a veteran Kentucky corn farmer, and a retired racehorse trainer.
- M. Emmet Walsh as Sheriff Woodzie, an old, wise racetrack gambler and friend of the Walsh family.
- Wendie Malick as Clara Dalrymple, Nolan's arrogant former employer and Channing's boss.
- Gary Bullock as John Cooper, a racehorse trainer who follows Clara's instructions to get his paychecks.
- Caspar Poyck as a mailman who beats Stripes after the latter runs into a tree in their usual race.

=== Voices ===
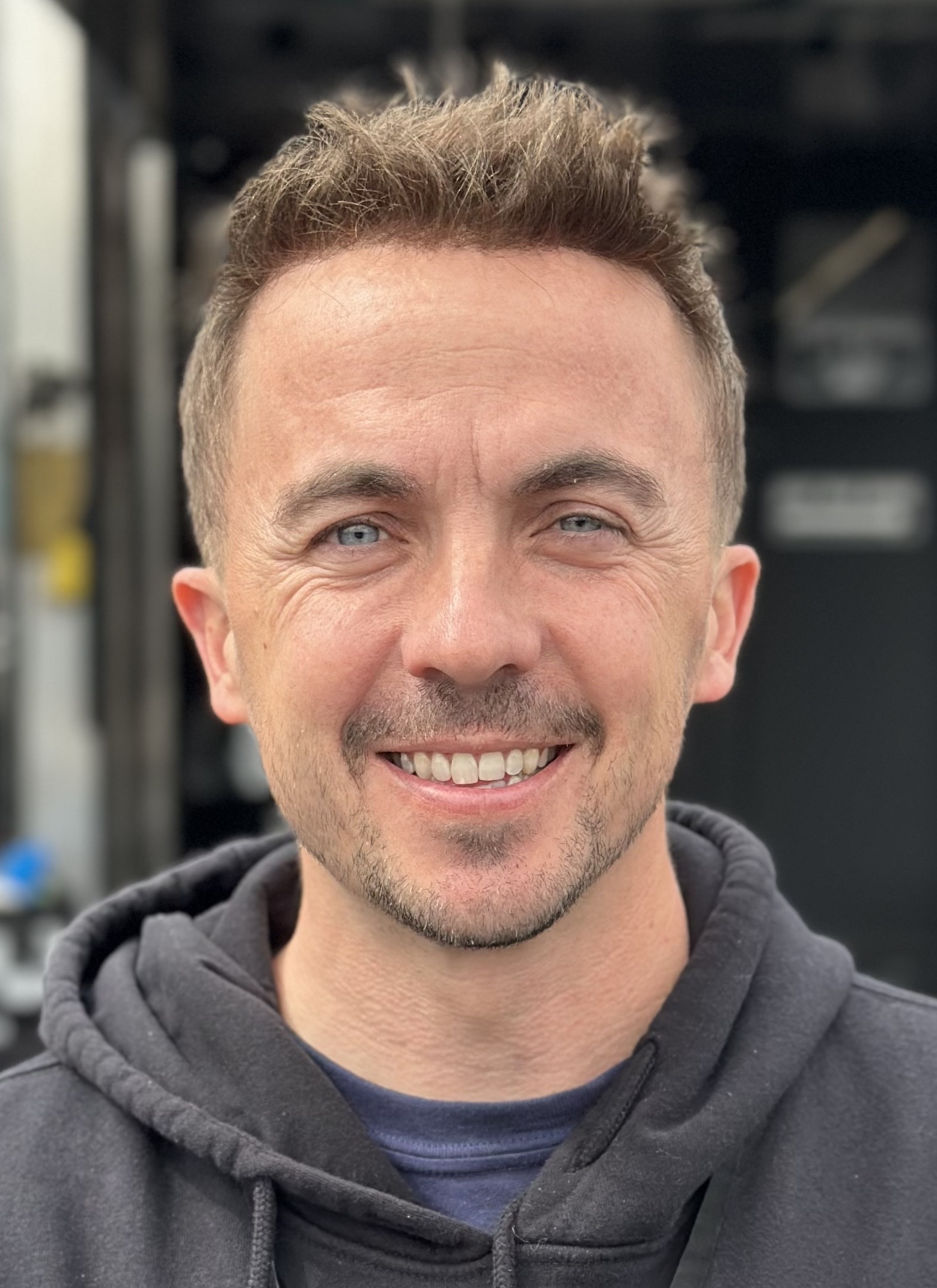
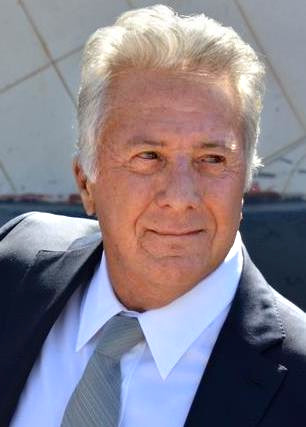
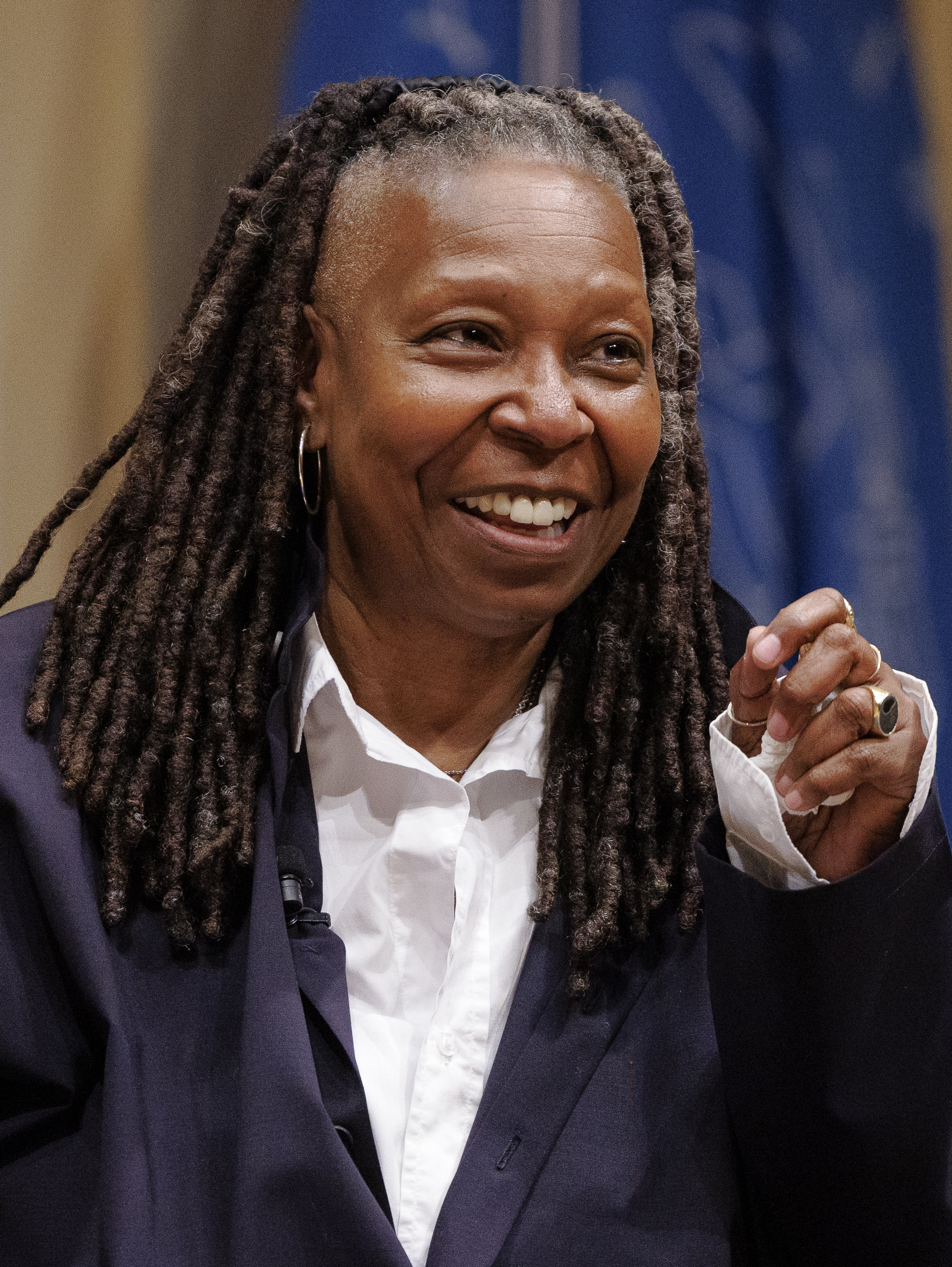
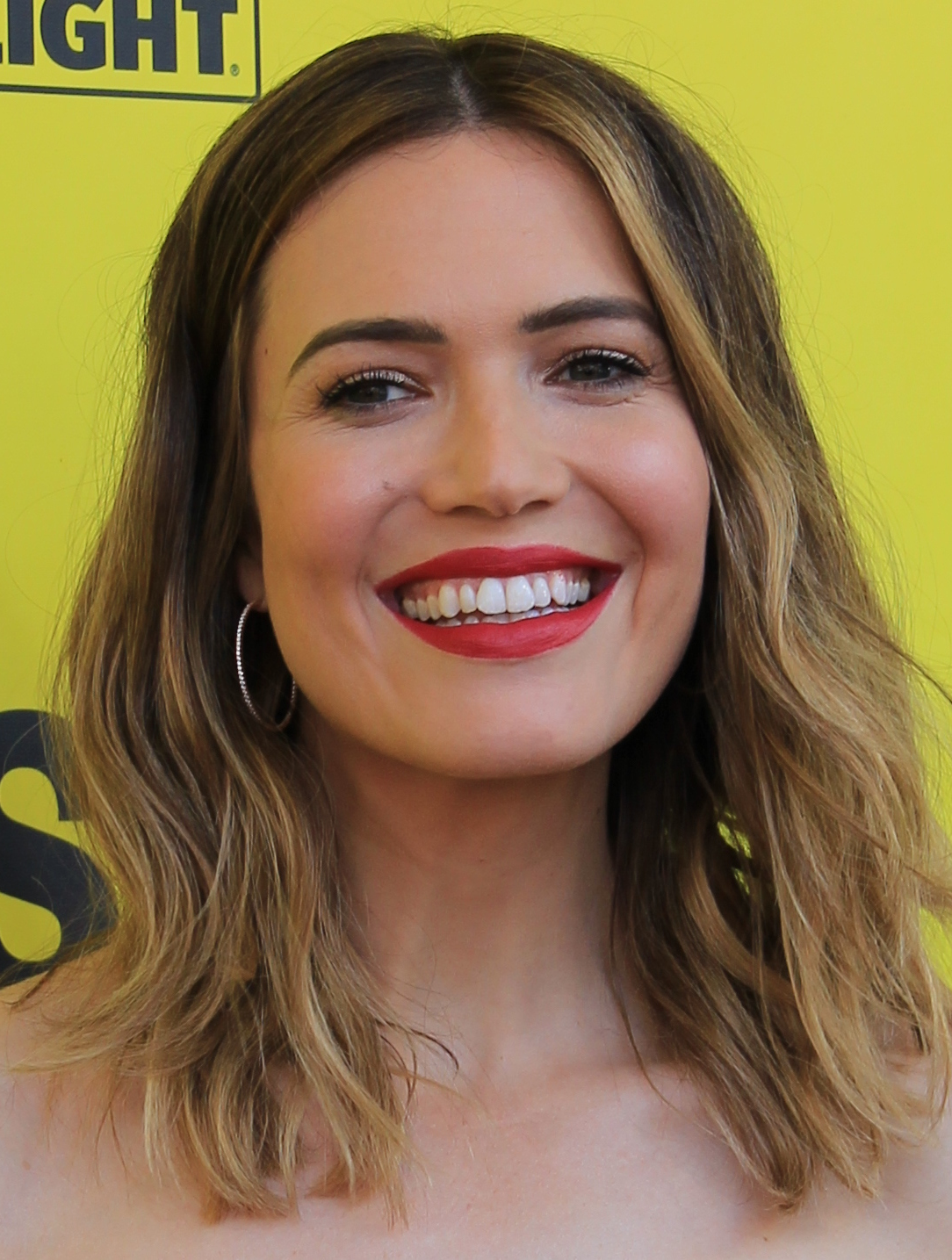
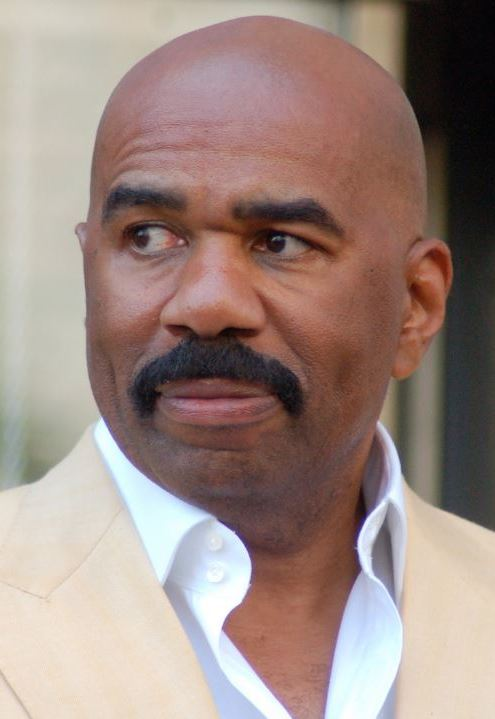
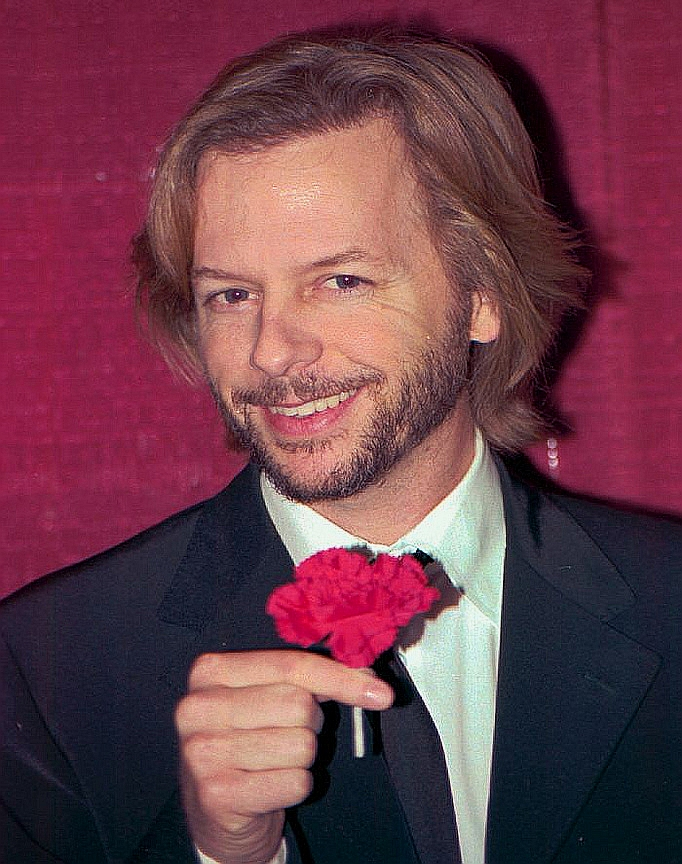
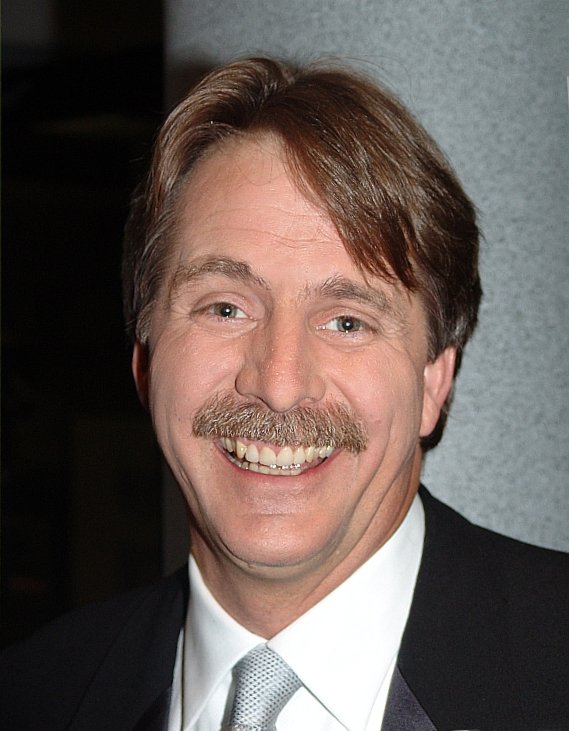
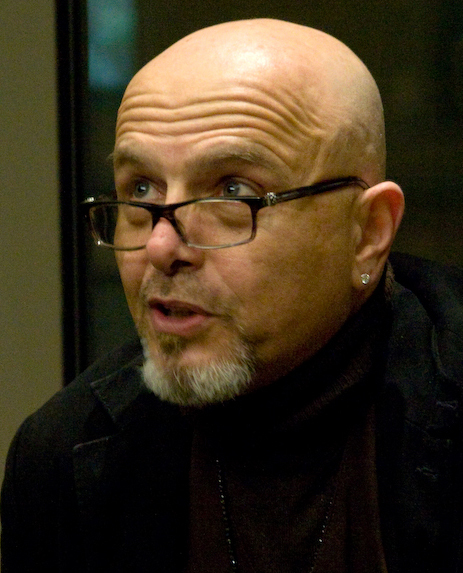
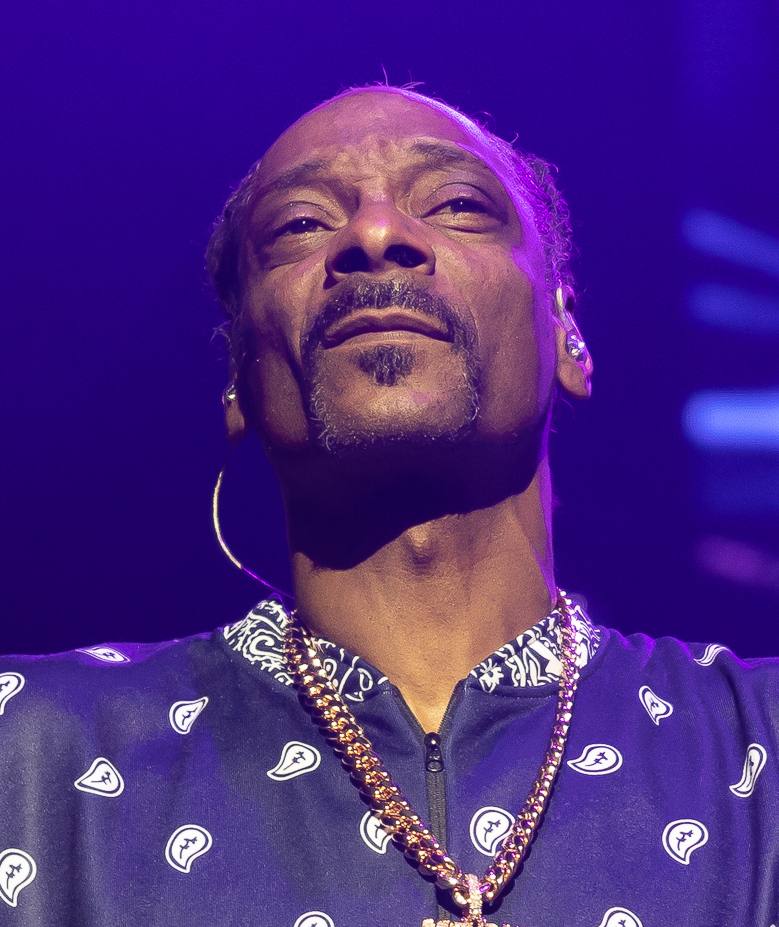
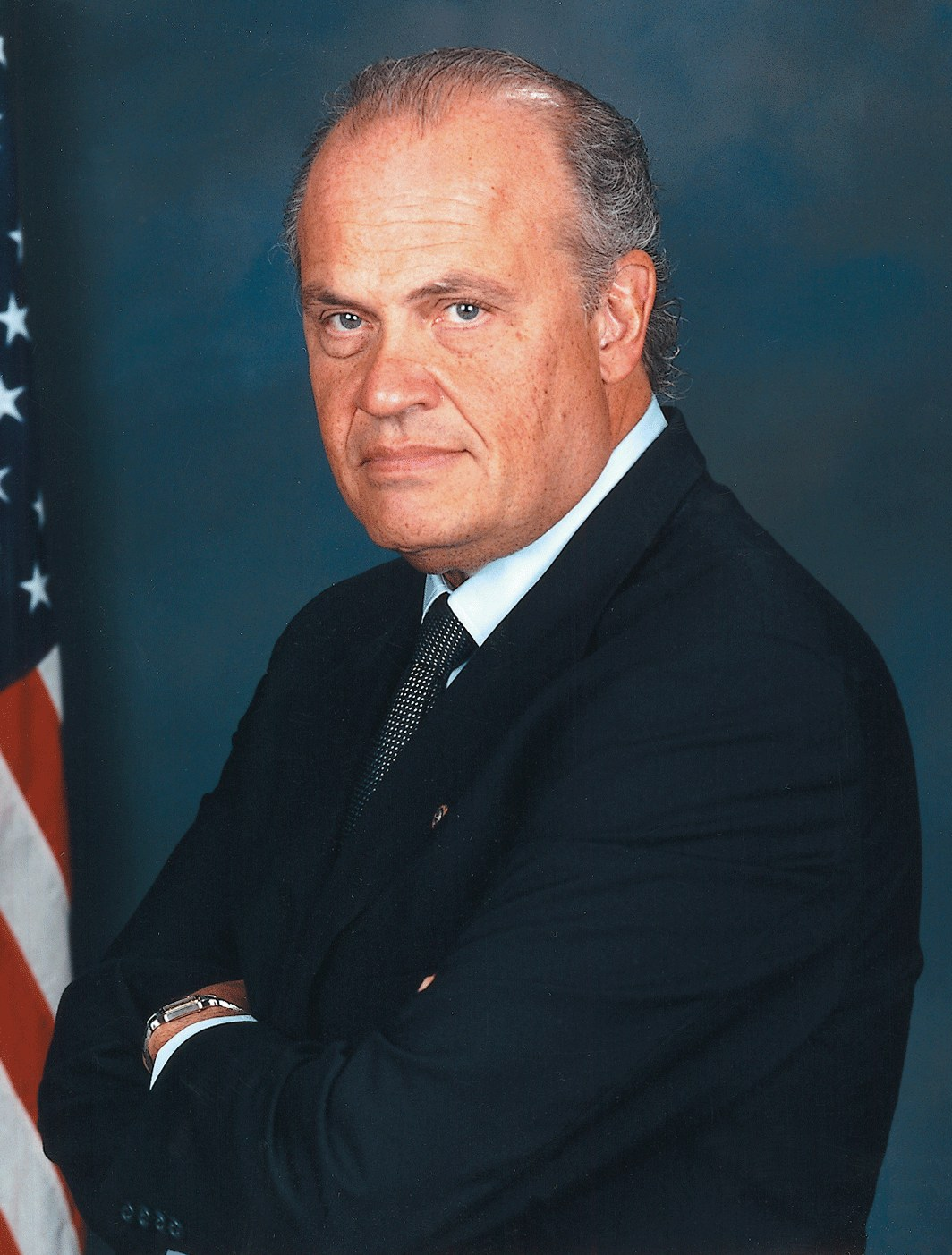
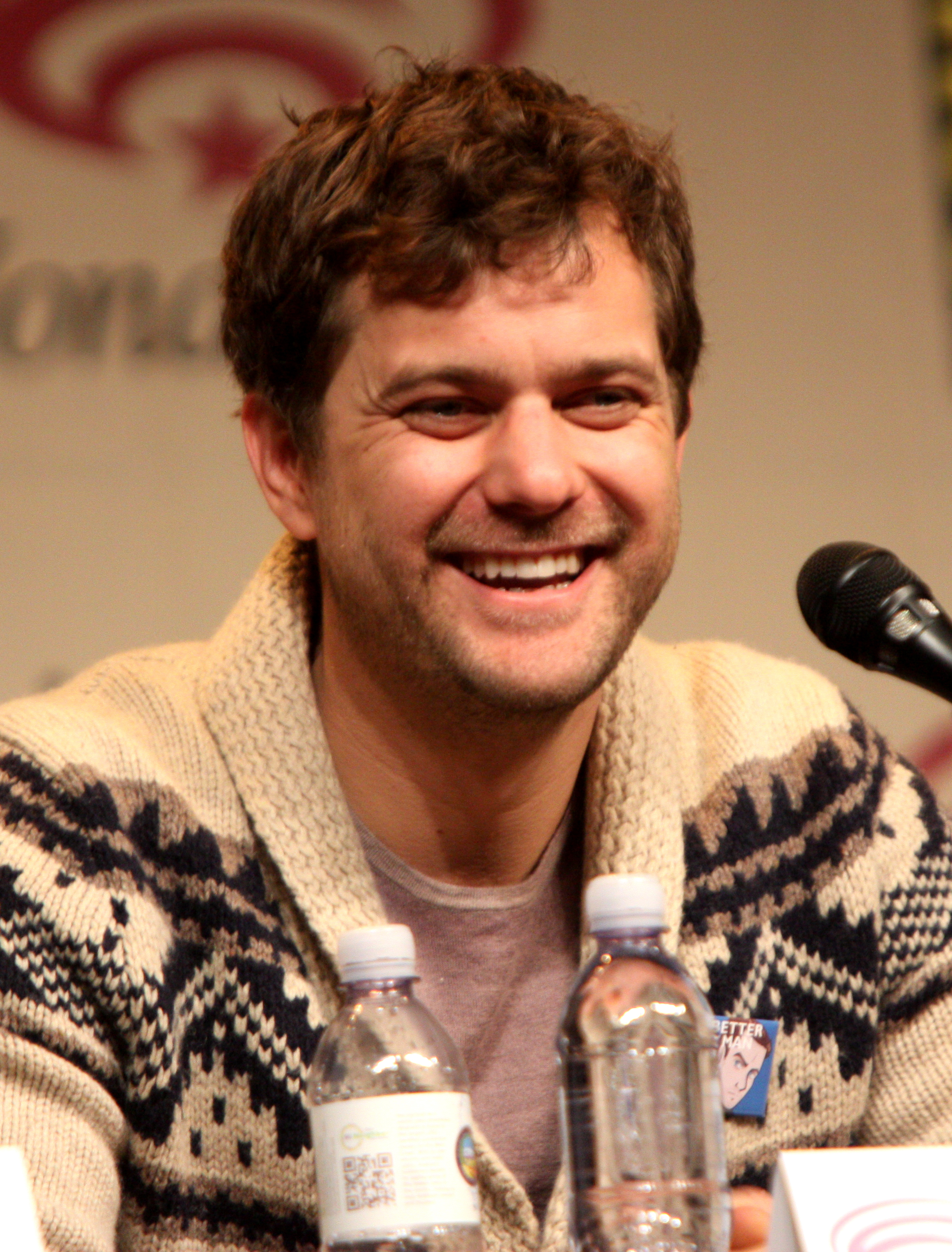
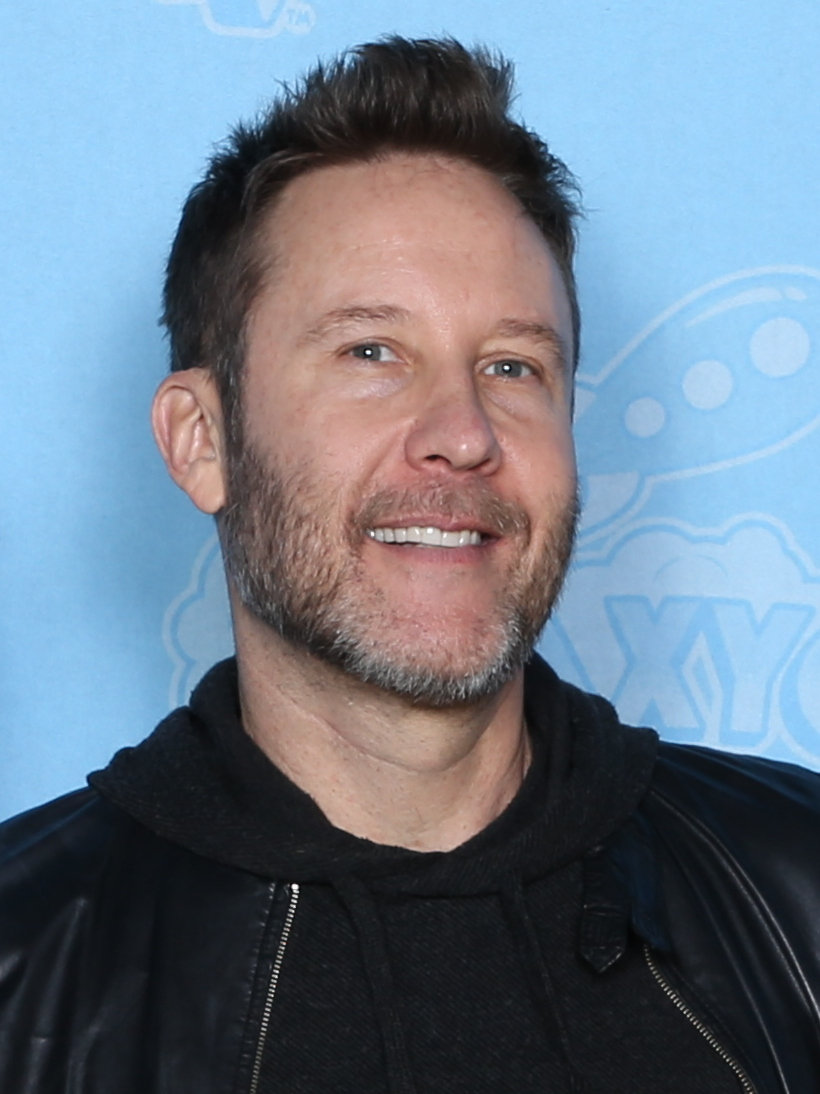
Top: Frankie Muniz, Dustin Hoffman and Whoopi Goldberg voice Stripes, Tucker and Franny.

Middle: Mandy Moore, Steve Harvey and David Spade voice Sandy, Buzz and Scuzz.

Bottom: Jeff Foxworthy, Joe Pantoliano, Snoop Dogg, Fred Thompson, Joshua Jackson and Michael Rosenbaum voice Reggie, Goose, Lightning, Sir Trenton, Trenton's Pride and Ruffshodd.
- Frankie Muniz as Stripes, a foundling plains zebra who aspires to race in the Kentucky Open.
  - Jansen Panettiere voices Stripes' younger self.
- Dustin Hoffman as Tucker, a grumpy brown Shetland pony.
- Whoopi Goldberg as Franny, a Saanen goat who encourages Stripes to achieve his racing dreams and gives him good advice.
- Mandy Moore as Sandy, a white Arabian filly who is a professional jumper and Stripes' love interest.
- Steve Harvey and David Spade as Buzz and Scuzz, a pair of horsefly brothers who are friends with Tucker.
- Jeff Foxworthy as Reggie, a Rhode Island Red who, despite his lack of intelligence, also serves as a news announcer.
- Joe Pantoliano as Goose, a New York-accented American white pelican from the city.
- Snoop Dogg as Lightning, the Walshes' lazy bloodhound who makes jokes while sleeping.
- Fred Thompson as Sir Trenton, an arrogant and strict black thoroughbred horse and the father of Trenton's Pride.
- Joshua Jackson as Trenton's Pride, Sir Trenton's strong-willed son who bullies Stripes.
  - Kyle Alcazar voices Pride's younger self.
- Michael Rosenbaum as Ruffshodd, Pride's friend who bullies Stripes alongside the former.
  - Frankie Ryan Manriquez voices Ruffshodd's younger self.
- Michael Clarke Duncan as a Clydesdale horse who hosts the Blue Moon Races.

== Production ==
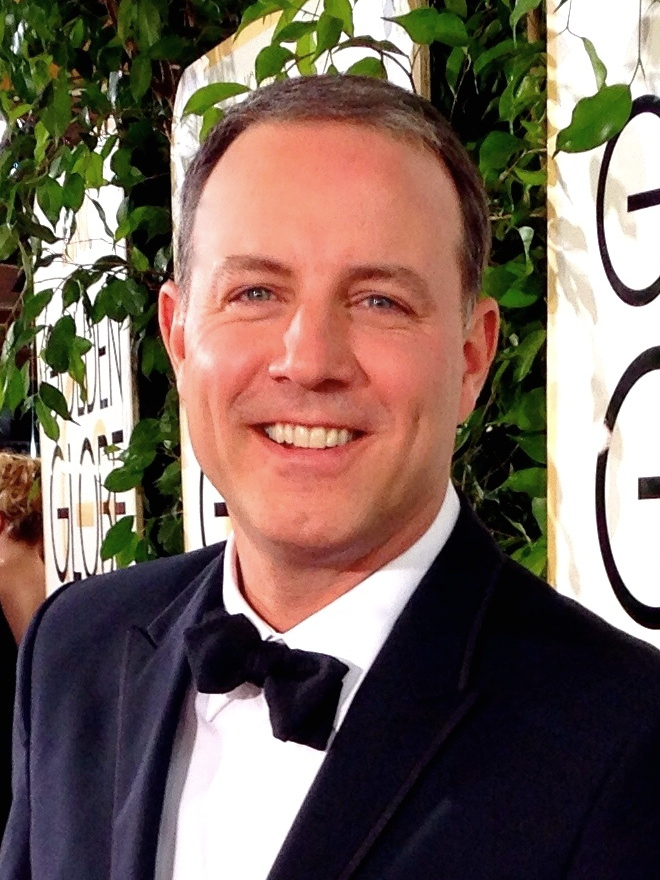
Kirk DeMicco is the film's writer.

On September 10, 2002, it was announced that Frederik Du Chau was hired and set to direct Racing Stripes. David Schmidt, Steven P. Wegner and Kirk DeMicco wrote the script for the film. Andrew Kosove, Broderick Johnson, Lloyd Phillips and Edward L. McDonnell produced the film with the budget of $30 million, for release in 2005. On March 25, 2003, it was announced that Mark Isham would compose the music for the film.

Two racing zebras, Sam and Daisy, were used in the film. Sam was more well-behaved, and "kind of wanted to be a horse", according to Tim Rivers, who trained him at the Animals in Motion farm near Citra, Florida. Sam had previously appeared in Ace Ventura: When Nature Calls, Second Noah and Sheena.

During production of the film, Hayden Panettiere was thrown off a zebra and ended up hospitalized with a concussion and a pinched nerve in her neck. The producers forbade her from mentioning the injury during publicity for the film; she finally revealed it during a 2013 episode of British talk show The Graham Norton Show.

=== Casting ===
In March 2003, Frankie Muniz was cast following his performance in Agent Cody Banks. On July 27, 2003, other cast members were announced, such as Hayden Panettiere, who would star opposite the voices of Dustin Hoffman, Whoopi Goldberg, Joe Pantoliano, Mandy Moore, and Patrick Stewart.

Also joining the cast of voices were Joshua Jackson, Michael Rosenbaum, Steve Harvey, David Spade, Michael Clarke Duncan, and Jeff Foxworthy. In August, Bruce Greenwood was cast in the film. Patrick Stewart was originally going to voice Sir Trenton.

=== Filming ===
It was filmed at the Hollywoodbets Scottsville Racecourse in Pietermaritzburg, South Africa, and Riverholm Country Estate in Nottingham Road, South Africa. Development of the film was completed in Los Angeles, California. On May 21, Summit Entertainment and Warner Bros. acquired distribution rights to the film.

== Soundtrack ==
The film's score was composed by Mark Isham, who also produced and cowrote "Taking the Inside Rail" with Sting; "It Ain't Over Yet", heard when Channing and Nolan train Stripes, as well as at the end of the film, was written by Bryan Adams, Gretchen Peters and Eliot Kennedy, and produced by Adams. The soundtrack album was released January 11, 2005, on the Varèse Sarabande label.

1. "Taking the Inside Rail" - Sting
2. "It Was a Dark and Stormy Night"
3. "At Home on Walsh Farm"
4. "I'm a Racehorse!"
5. "The Blue Moon Races"
6. "A Pelican Named Goose"
7. "Tucker Lays It Out!"
8. "Goose Makes a Hit on the Iron Horse"
9. "Run Like the Wind"
10. "Twilight Run"
11. "Upstaged by a Zebra"
12. "A Brave Decision"
13. "Glory Days"
14. "If You Build It, They Will Come"
15. "Out of Africa"
16. "Spring Training"
17. "Ambushed!"
18. "Filly in Distress"
19. "Race Day"
20. "They're All In!"
21. "The Big Race"
22. "In The Winner's Circle"
23. "It Ain't Over Yet" - Bryan Adams
24. "The Good, The Bad and The Ugly" – Ennio Morricone
25. "My Girl" – Steve Harvey
26. "U Can't Touch This" – David Spade
27. "Here Comes The Hotstepper" - David Spade
28. "Ebony and Ivory" - Steve Harvey and David Spade
29. Overture, from 'Le nozze di Figaro (The Marriage of Figaro)' K.492 - Hungarian State Orchestra
30. "Exsultate, jubillate, K.165" - Kosice Teachers' Choir/Camerata Cassovia
31. "Walk This Way" - Run-D.M.C.
32. The National Anthem USA
33. "Who Let The Dogs Out?" - Steve Harvey and David Spade

The theme song for the Japanese version is "I Will" by Hitomi Shimatani.

== Reception ==
=== Box office ===
Racing Stripes grossed $49.8 million in the United States and $41 million in other territories, for a worldwide total of $90.8 million.

=== Critical response ===
On Rotten Tomatoes, the film holds an approval rating of 35% based on 97 reviews, with an average rating of 5/10. The site's critics consensus reads: "Racing Stripes might be good for a few laps with younger viewers, but it's too blandly predictable to truly recommend for an all-ages audience." On Metacritic, the film has a weighted average score of 43 out of 100 based on 26 critics, indicating "mixed or average" reviews. Audiences polled by CinemaScore give the film an average grade of "A" on an A+ to F scale.

Kevin Thomas of The Los Angeles Times said, "In the live-action talking animal genre, Racing Stripes is no Babe but should delight youngsters, although parents likely will find it is sentimental in the extreme, with a plot that telegraphs every development."

=== Awards ===
International Film Music Critics Award (IFMCA) 2005

Award	Category	Nominee	Result
IFMCA Award	Best Original Score for a Comedy Film	Mark Isham	Nominated

Teen Choice Awards 2005

Award	Category	Nominee	Result
Teen Choice Award	Choice Movie: Animated/Computer Generated	Frederik Du Chau	Nominated

== See also ==
- List of films about horses
- List of films about horse racing
