= Chasing Liberty =

2004 film by Andy Cadiff

- Theatrical release poster
- Directed by: Andy Cadiff
- Written by: Derek Guiley; David Schneiderman
- Produced by: Broderick Johnson; David Parfitt; Andrew A. Kosove
- Starring: Mandy Moore; Matthew Goode; Jeremy Piven; Annabella Sciorra; Caroline Goodall; Mark Harmon
- Cinematography: Ashley Rowe
- Edited by: Jon Gregory
- Music by: Christian Henson
- Production company: Alcon Entertainment
- Distributed by: Warner Bros. Pictures
- Release date: January 9, 2004 (United States)
- Running time: 111 minutes
- Countries: United States; United Kingdom
- Language: English
- Budget: $23 million
- Box office: $12 million

Chasing Liberty is a 2004 romantic comedy film directed by Andy Cadiff, starring Mandy Moore and Matthew Goode and written by Derek Guiley and David Schneiderman.

The film is about the 18-year-old daughter of the President of the United States whose rebellion against the constant presence of Secret Service agents in her life leads to a European adventure and an unexpected romance.

It was filmed on location in Prague, Venice, Berlin, London, Chelmsford, and Washington, D.C. Chasing Liberty was released by Warner Bros. Pictures in the United States on January 9, 2004. The film received negative reviews from critics and grossed $12 million against a $23 million budget, making it a box office bomb.

== Plot ==
Anna Foster is the daughter of President of the United States, James Foster. After Secret Service agents ruin a first date, she demands less supervision. For his upcoming trip to Prague, the president agrees to assign only two agents to watch over Anna, whose Secret Service codename is Liberty.

In Prague, Anna and her friend Gabrielle Le Clerc attend a concert, where she spots numerous agents in the crowd. Believing her father has broken his promise, she eludes her protectors with Gabrielle's help. Outside the theater, she asks Ben Calder for a ride on his motorbike. Unknown to Anna, he is a Secret Service agent, and he informs agents Alan Weiss and Cynthia Morales where she can be found. When the president learns of her behavior, he instructs Ben to guard her without revealing his identity, to give her the illusion of freedom while guaranteeing safety.

Believing she is finally free, Anna jumps into the Vltava River naked, mistaking it for the Danube, and she and Ben climb a rooftop to watch an Offenbach opera being shown in a plaza. The next morning, Anna calls her parents. Initially relieved his daughter is safe, the President's tone changes when he is shown photos of her skinny-dipping.

Outraged at her father's tone, Anna decides she will go to the Love Parade in Berlin. She and Ben board a train, where they meet Scotty McGruff, a flighty romantic backpacker who gives them a stack of Six Million Dollar Man stickers, telling them to post them in random places. One day when they are unhappy, they may come across one and it will make them smile. Ben discovers that they have boarded a Venice-bound train going in the opposite direction from Berlin.

In Venice, after checking in with agents Weiss and Morales—who are now growing closer romantically—Ben joins Anna and McGruff and together they explore the city. McGruff disappears with Anna's wallet, she is recognized by tourists and she and Ben flee.

With no money, they tell kind-hearted gondolier Eugenio that they recently eloped against her parents' wishes. During the free gondola ride, Ben kisses Anna to hide her from their pursuers. When he learns the "newlyweds" have no place to stay, Eugenio invites them to his house, where they are welcomed by his mother Maria. That night, thinking their kiss was heartfelt, Anna offers herself to Ben, but he rejects her advances.

The next day, Eugenio drives them to the Austrian border, as Weiss and Morales show up at Maria's and are told that Anna and Ben are newlyweds, which is then reported to Anna's parents, causing confusion. Upset at Ben's rejection, Anna hitchhikes a ride in a truck, leaving him to chase her through the Austrian countryside. She comes to a bridge, where she meets the Jumping Germans, a bungee jumping group. Ben arrives just as Anna is being strapped into the harness and insists on jumping with her.

Later that evening at the Jumping Germans' camp, one of them invites Anna to share his tent for the night. She refuses and flirts with Ben, who rejects her advances again. Upset, she declares that she will go to the German's tent after all; Ben finally admits his feelings for Anna, and they spend the night together.

At the Love Parade, as Ben explains his actions on the phone to his fellow agents, Anna overhears his identity. Enraged at the apparent betrayal, she runs off, only to be harassed by a group of men who recognize her. Ben rescues her, and Anna and her family return to the United States.

While preparing for college, Anna tells her mother her heart is "a little bit broken." At college, with Weiss and Morales (who plan to marry) still protecting her, she sees a Six Million Dollar Man sticker, reminding her of her European adventure.

During Christmas break Anna's father tells her Ben resigned from the Secret Service and is working as a photographer in London. So, on an exchange program with Oxford University Anna visits him at the opera, where they kiss, reconcile, and escape on his motorbike.

== Cast ==
- Mandy Moore as Anna Foster
- Matthew Goode as Secret Service Special Agent Ben Calder
- Jeremy Piven as Special Agent Alan Weiss
- Annabella Sciorra as Special Agent Cynthia Morales
- Caroline Goodall as First Lady Michelle Foster
- Mark Harmon as President James Foster
- Miriam Margolyes as Maria
- Martin Hancock as Scotty McGruff
- Joseph Long as Eugenio
- Beatrice Rosen as Gabrielle la Claire
- Stark Sands as Grant Hillman
- Tony Jayawardena as White House Guard
- Sam Ellis as Phil
- Terence Maynard as Harper
- Lewis Hancock as Press Secretary
- Garrick Hagon as Secretary of State
- Zac Benoir as Chairman of the Joint Chiefs of Staff
- Jan Goodman as National Security Advisor
- Robert Ashe as Chief of Staff
- Adrian Bouchet as Gus Gus
- The Roots as Themselves

== Production ==
In November 2000, it was announced Alcon Entertainment had purchased Untitled First Daughter Project by screenwriters Derek Guiley and David Schneiderman with Andy Cadiff signed to direct.

=== Story ===
The storyline was directly inspired by Chelsea Clinton, who was photographed trying to blend in with other students at a Stanford basketball game.

The problem that Anna Foster (Moore) faces in the film—excessively protective Secret Service agents guarding children of United States Government officials—was previously explored in the 1980 comedy First Family, with Bob Newhart as the president.

The story in many ways echoes the 1953 romantic comedy Roman Holiday with Gregory Peck, Audrey Hepburn and Eddie Albert. Hepburn played a princess who slips away from her handlers to be squired around Rome, also on a motor scooter, by Peck, not realizing that he knows her identity and plans a magazine story. In both films, the leads are accompanied by a goofy friend, in this case played by Albert.

=== Filming locations ===
The exterior scenes of the White House were in fact filmed at Hylands House in Chelmsford, Essex, England, because of its resemblance to the White House. Blueprints of the White House were also used to create a digital replica, which helped make the exterior scenes look authentic.

- Washington, D.C., United States
- Prague, Czech Republic
- Venice, Italy
- Berlin, Germany
- London, England
- Hylands House, Chelmsford, Essex, England
- Barrandov Studios, Prague, Czech Republic
- Pinewood Studios, Iver Heath, Buckinghamshire, England

=== Soundtrack ===
The original score by Christian Henson was nominated for the World Soundtrack Award in 2004. The film also features the songs:

- "American Girl" – written by Tom Petty; performed by Tom Petty and the Heartbreakers
- "Life Will Go On" – written and performed by Chris Isaak
- "If I'm Not in Love" – written by Dawn Thomas; performed by Faith Hill
- "Stop the Rock" – written by Hoxley, Gray, Gray and Noko; performed by Apollo 440
- "Vivi Davvero" – written and performed by Giorgia
- "Stay Away" – written by Robert Schwartzman; performed by Rooney
- "Melody" – written by Joe DuBass Henson, Darren Rose, Wasi; performed by 7th Sun
- "The Seed" – written by Tariq Trotter and Cody ChesnuTT; performed by The Roots
- "Deja Vu" – written by Frantisek Cerny; performed by Frantisek Cerny, Milan Cimfe and Pavel Karlik
- "If You Won't" – written and performed by Jesse Harris
- "Who Needs Shelter" – written by Jason Mraz, Eric Schermerhorn and Chris Keup; performed by Jason Mraz
- "Get Busy" – written by Sean Paul, S. Marsden; performed by Sean Paul
- "You're Free" – written by John Ciafone, Lem Springsteen, Ultra Naté, Paul Masterson; performed by Yomanda
- "Satisfaction" – written by A. Benassi; performed by Benny Benassi presents The Biz
- "Wide Open Space" – written by Paul Draper; performed by Mansun
- "Nessun dorma" – written by Giacomo Puccini; performed by Amici Forever
- "To Be with You" – written by Caroline Lost, Christian Henson; performed by Caroline Lost

== Reception ==
=== Box office ===
Chasing Liberty opened on January 9, 2004, worldwide in 2,400 theatres, earning $6,081,483 on its opening weekend. It went on to gross $12,195,626 domestically with an additional $117,697 in international revenue, totaling $12,313,323 in worldwide gross earnings, failing to bring back its $23 million budget.

=== Critical response ===
The film received mostly negative reviews from critics. Chasing Liberty scored an 19% rating on Rotten Tomatoes based on 116 reviews, with a consensus that it was "Formulaic comfort food for the teen crowd." Metacritic, which uses a weighted average, assigned the film a score of 46 out of 100, based on 32 critics, indicating "mixed or average" reviews.

Michael O'Sullivan of The Washington Post wrote, "Chasing Liberty will probably win over as many fuddy-duddy fathers as fillies with its mixture of sweetness tempered with genial cynicism."

Roger Ebert gave the film a two out of four-star rating and found it "surprisingly good in areas where it doesn't need to be good at all, and pretty awful in areas where it has to succeed." Ebert did appreciate Moore's performance, writing, "Moore is just plain likeable, a slurpee blended from scoops of Mary Tyler Moore, Sally Field and Doris Day."

In his ReelViews review, James Berardinelli called Chasing Liberty "a fairly standard-issue teen romantic comedy."

In his review in the San Francisco Chronicle, Mick LaSalle wrote, "Chasing Liberty is a kind of remake of It Happened One Night (1934), updated and retooled for a young audience that won't recognize the connection." LaSalle applauds the film's ability to evoke a young girl's experience of being on her own for the first time, writing, "Anna and Ben romp through Prague and, later, Venice, having adventures and misadventures and meeting various colorful characters, and it's all quite engaging. We understand what this freedom means to Anna, partly thanks to Moore's expressive intelligence, but also through director Andy Cadiff's technique. We see a rock concert, a late-night outdoor screening of an operatic film and the splendors of historic cities through the eyes of a young girl experiencing them for the first time."

=== Accolades ===
- 2004 Teen Choice Award Nomination for Choice Breakout Movie Star – Male (Matthew Goode)
- 2004 Teen Choice Award Nomination for Choice Movie – Date Movie
- 2004 Teen Choice Award Nomination for Choice Movie Actress – Drama/Action Adventure (Mandy Moore)
- 2004 Teen Choice Award Nomination for Choice Movie Liar (Matthew Goode)
- 2004 World Soundtrack Award Nomination for Discovery of the Year (Christian Henson)
