= Lost & Found (1999 film) =

1999 film by Jeff Pollack

- Theatrical release poster
- Directed by: Jeff Pollack
- Written by: J. B. Cook; Marc Meeks; David Spade
- Produced by: Andrew Kosove; Broderick Johnson; Morrie Eisenman; Wayne Rice
- Starring: David Spade; Sophie Marceau; Patrick Bruel; Artie Lange; Mitchell Whitfield; Martin Sheen
- Cinematography: Paul Elliott
- Edited by: Christopher Greenbury
- Music by: John Debney
- Production companies: Alcon Entertainment; Wayne Rice Productions; Dinamo Entertainment
- Distributed by: Warner Bros.
- Release date: April 23, 1999
- Running time: 99 minutes
- Country: United States
- Language: English
- Budget: $30 million
- Box office: $6.5 million (USA)

Lost & Found is a 1999 American romantic comedy film directed by Jeff Pollack, written by J. B. Cook, Marc Meeks, and David Spade, and starring Spade, Sophie Marceau, Patrick Bruel, Artie Lange, Mitchell Whitfield, and Martin Sheen. It was the first film produced by Alcon Entertainment and was released by Warner Bros. on April 23, 1999, and was a critical and commercial failure, grossing $6.5 million against a $30 million budget.

== Plot ==
Restaurant owner Dylan Ramsey is head-over-heels in love with his new neighbor, a French cellist named Lila. In a desperate attempt to garner her affections, he kidnaps her beloved pet dog and offers to help her find him on a phantom dog hunt. A wrench is thrown in his plans, however, when the dog swallows his best friend's diamond ring, and things get worse for Dylan as Lila's ex-fiancée, Rene, arrives to win her back.

== Cast ==
- David Spade as Dylan Ramsey
- Sophie Marceau as Lila Dubois
- Patrick Bruel as Rene
- Artie Lange as Wally Slack
- Mitchell Whitfield as Mark Gildewell
- Martin Sheen as Millstone
- Christian Clemenson as Ray
- Estelle Harris as Mrs. Stubblefield
- Marla Gibbs as Enid
- Rose Marie as Clara
- Carole Cook as Sylvia
- Michelle Clunie as Gail
- Ever Carradine as Ginger
- Carl Michael Lindner as Brat
- Jon Lovitz as Uncle Harry Briggs
- Frankie Pace as Sal
- Hal Sparks as DJ
- Jason Stuart as Jewelry Store Clerk
- Frankie Muniz as Boy in TV Movie
- Agata Gotova as Party Guest (uncredited)

== Reception ==
=== Box office ===
The film grossed $6,552,255 in the US against a budget of $30 million.

=== Critical response ===
On Rotten Tomatoes the film has an approval rating of 13% based on reviews from 52 critics. The site's consensus states: "Aside from a few laughs, everything else is entirely predictable, including the jokes." On Metacritic it has a score of 19% based on reviews from 21 critics, indicating "overwhelming dislike". Audiences surveyed by CinemaScore gave the film a grade B− on scale of A to F.

Roger Ebert gave it 1 out of 4 and said it had only one funny scene, Jon Lovitz as a dog whisperer. Stephen Holden calling it "a rancid little nothing of a movie" in The New York Times.
