= Aiguille de la Grande Sassière =

Mountain in Italy

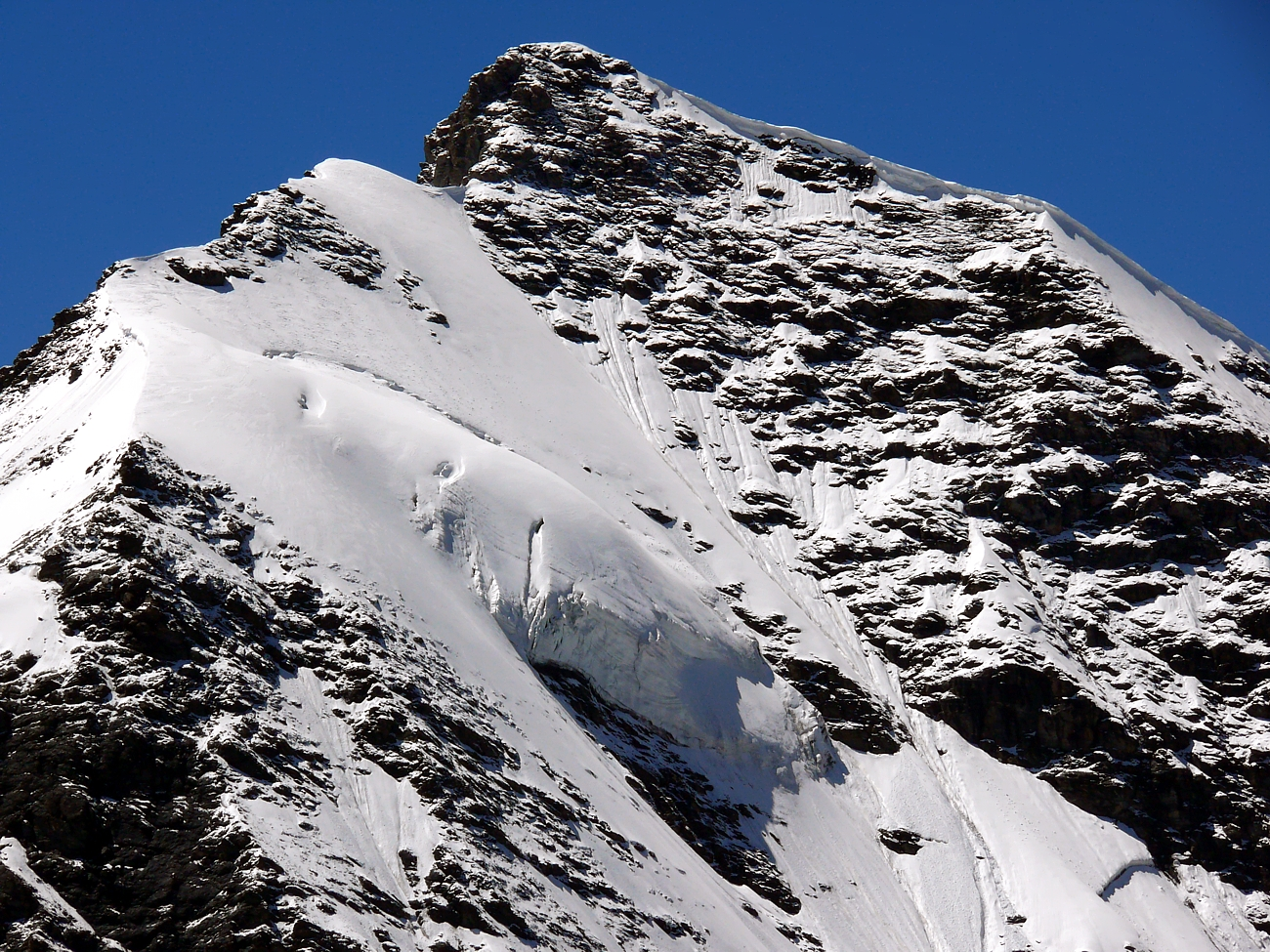
- Aiguille de la Grande Sassière

Highest point
- Elevation: 3,751 m (12,306 ft)
- Prominence: 792
- Isolation: 11.21 km (6.97 mi)
- Listing: Alpine mountains above 3000 m
- Coordinates: 45°30′18″N 6°59′59″E

Geography
- Location within Alps
- Location: Aosta Valley, Italy/Savoie, France
- Parent range: Graian Alps

Climbing
- First ascent: 1808 or 1810 by inhabitants of Tignes and soldiers First officially reported ascent by William Mathews and Michel Croz on 5 August 1860

Aiguille de la Grande Sassière is a mountain in the Graian Alps, on the boundary between the Aosta Valley (northern Italy) and the French department of Savoie.

On the Italian side, it marks the end of the Valgrisenche; on the French side it commands the Val d'Isère.
