= Broderick Johnson =

American film producer

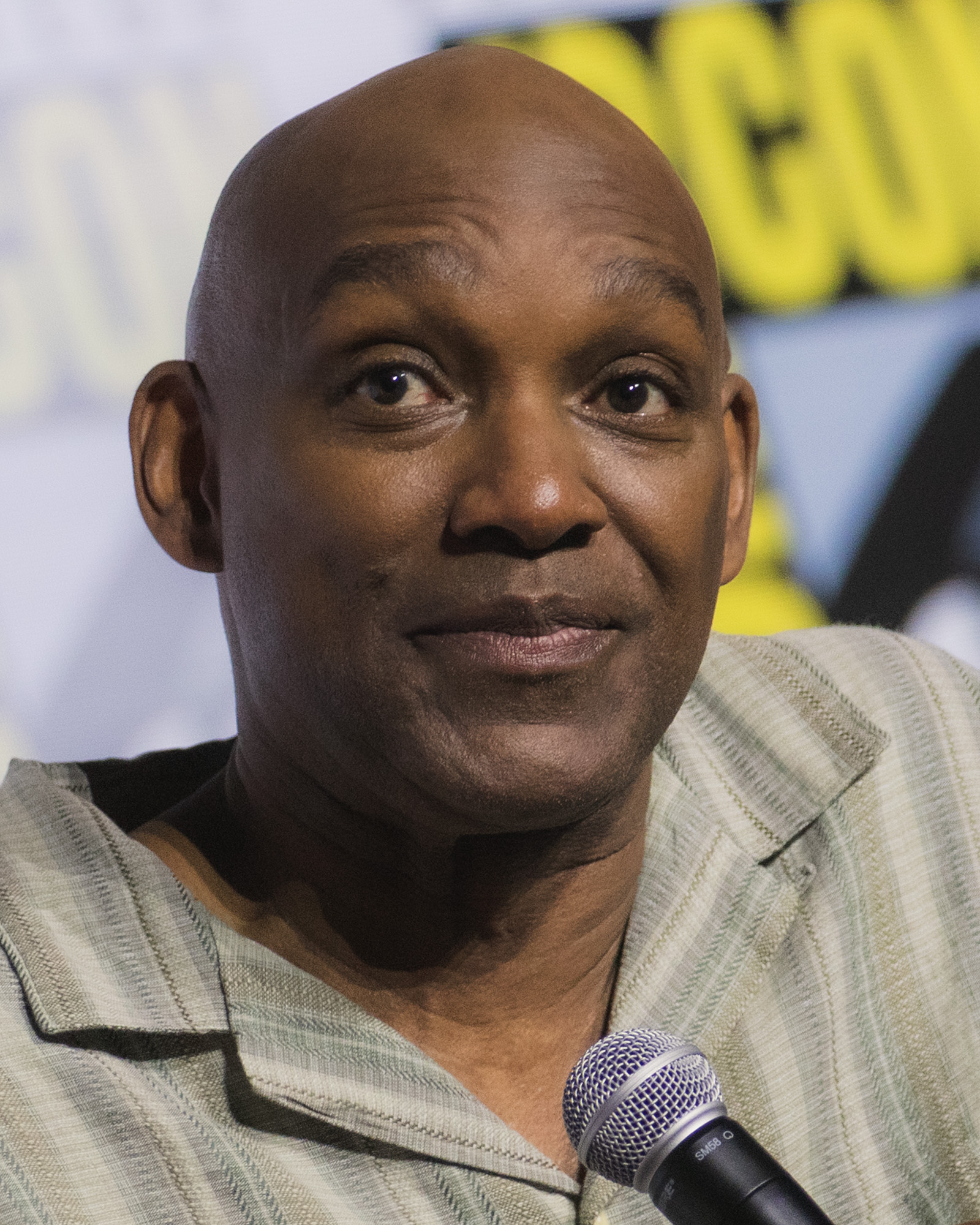
- Johnson at the 2026 San Diego Comic-Con
- Education: Princeton University
- Occupation: Film producer
- Children: 3

Broderick Johnson is the co-founder and co-CEO of Alcon Entertainment, which he formed with his producing partner Andrew Kosove in 1997.

His film credits include the Academy Award nominated Best Picture The Blind Side. His TV credits include The Expanse.
