= The Sisterhood of the Traveling Pants (disambiguation) =

The Sisterhood of the Traveling Pants is a series of young-adult novels by Ann Brashares.

The Sisterhood of the Traveling Pants may also refer to:

- The Sisterhood of the Traveling Pants (novel), the first book in the series
- The Sisterhood of the Traveling Pants (film series)
  - The Sisterhood of the Traveling Pants (film), a 2005 film adaptation, followed by a sequel
  - The Sisterhood of the Traveling Pants 2, the 2008 sequel to the 2005 film
- It can also refer to the four central characters of the Traveling Pants series: Lena Kaligaris, Bridget Vreeland, Tibby Rollins, and Carmen Lowell.
