= The Last Summer (of You and Me) =

Book by Ann Brashares

- Front cover
- Author: Ann Brashares
- Language: English
- Genre: Novel
- Publisher: Riverhead Books
- Publication date: 2007
- Publication place: United States
- Media type: Print (Hardback)
- Pages: 320 pp
- ISBN: 978-1-59448-917-4
- OCLC: 85783364
- Dewey Decimal: 813/.6 22
- LC Class: PS3602.R385 L37 2007

The Last Summer (of You and Me) is a novel written by Ann Brashares. Her first novel for adults, and her first outside of her acclaimed Traveling Pants series, it was released on June 6, 2007 by Riverhead Books.

== Plot ==
The story is set on Fire Island, and also partly in nearby New York City. Alice, age 21, and Riley, 24, are two sisters. Nearly every summer of their lives, they have shared the same childhood friend, Paul, 24, whose widowed mother owns a Fire Island beach mansion next door to the smaller beach house of the girls and their parents. Paul has been absent for three summers, having been studying and volunteering in California. Alice is smart, graceful and elegant, planning on applying to law school at NYU. Riley is the athletic and adventurous one, having life-guarded on the island since she was fifteen. She is dyslexic and has attended outdoor leadership school in Colorado. Paul is something of a hippie, following in his father's footsteps. He can be moody and is wary of trusting people. During the summer, Alice and Paul start to have feelings outside of friendship for each other. Paul goes to great lengths to hide his feelings about Alice. They both realize they have always loved one another, but now in a different way. Alice even goes as far to give Paul her virginity one night on the beach. They continue sneaking around, hiding their relationship from their families. One night when Alice has gone over to Paul's house to make love, the emergency alarm goes off during the middle of the night. Alice dismisses the alarm as an elderly person needing attention, but it is not so; the person being helicoptered out is her own sister, Riley. It seems Riley is suffering from rheumatic heart disease. Alice is overwhelmed with guilt and a rush of feelings. She suddenly leaves the island without explanation to be with her hospitalized sister and parents, leaving Paul puzzled and hurt. Riley refuses to face the urgency of the situation and insists that her medical condition be kept secret from Paul until she can tell him herself. The following summer, Alice postpones graduate school to work as a groundskeeper and store cashier near the family's Manhattan home, while Riley awaits a donor heart transplant. Alice buys Riley an indoor pool membership, which Riley is grateful for, trying to carry on normally and ignore her medical condition. During a swim, Riley misses an important opportunity to receive a heart transplant. While the rest of her family is upset over this, Riley insists that they stay out of her business, saying that she can take care of herself. Meanwhile, Paul, studying philosophy at NYU, is constantly thinking about Alice and his feelings towards her. Still unaware of Riley's condition, he is bitter and angry towards Alice. He even attends an old island acquaintance's wedding with a beautiful date to spite her. Riley finally tells Paul of her medical problems, admitting that she isn't entirely sure she wants a heart transplant. Paul's mother gives him the beach mansion, which he clears out and sells for $3 million. He donates the money to Bellevue Hospital, where his wealthy but wild-living father died long ago. One night back in the city, Alice returns from work to find Riley has died. The funeral is held and Alice and her parents go to Fire Island to spread her ashes. Alice volunteers to tend to the beach house, as the family has decided to sell it. Paul turns up one day, discovering his house has been sold to a new family whose children Alice babysits each morning. The story ends with Alice and Paul having sex and leaving the Island for the first time together; she has decided to apply to NYU school of social work and be with Paul.

== Reception ==
Early reviews have been mixed, with Publishers Weekly calling the book a "mediocre" read, but Library Journal calling the novel "thoughtful," and that it will "please her innumerable fans."

== Film adaptation ==
The film rights to The Last Summer (of You and Me) were bought by Warner Brothers for at least one million dollars. The screenplay was written by Jessica Goldberg and rewritten by Mike Thompson. Julie Anne Robinson is attached to direct the movie; it will be her second feature-length film following The Last Song. Brashares will be given executive producer credit. Warner Brothers also bought two of Brashare's previous novels, both from The Sisterhood of the Traveling Pants series, and turned them into two successful films: The Sisterhood of the Traveling Pants and The Sisterhood of the Traveling Pants 2.
