= 2005 Teen Choice Awards =

American awards ceremony held in California

- Date: August 16, 2005
- Location: Gibson Amphitheatre, Universal City, California
- Hosted by: Hilary Duff and Rob Schneider

Television/radio coverage
- Network: Fox

The 2005 Teen Choice Awards ceremony was held on August 16, 2005, at the Gibson Amphitheatre, Universal City, California. The awards celebrate the year's achievements in music, film, television, sports, fashion, comedy, video games, and the Internet, and were voted on by viewers living in the US, aged 13 and over through various social media sites. The event was hosted by Hilary Duff and Rob Schneider with Gwen Stefani, The Black Eyed Peas, The Pussycat Dolls and Simple Plan as performers. Stefani received the Visionary Award.

== Performers ==
- Gwen Stefani – "Hollaback Girl"
- The Black Eyed Peas – "Don't Phunk with My Heart"
- The Pussycat Dolls – "Don't Cha"
- Simple Plan – "Untitled (How Could This Happen to Me?)"

== Presenters ==
- Amanda Bynes
- Amber Tamblyn
- Anna Kournikova
- Ashlee Simpson
- Chingy
- David Boreanaz
- David Spade
- Debra Jo Rupp
- Emma Roberts
- Eva Longoria
- Eva Mendes
- Frankie J
- Halle Berry
- Hayden Panettiere
- Hilarie Burton
- Hulk Hogan
- Jesse McCartney
- Jessica Alba
- John Cena
- JoJo
- Kristen Bell
- Marlon Wayans
- Mischa Barton
- Nick Cannon
- Raven
- Regina King
- Reunion cast
- Richard Rubin
- Ryan Cabrera
- Ryan Reynolds
- Ryan Seacrest
- Shannon Elizabeth
- Shawn Wayans
- The Gotti Brothers
- Tyler Hilton
- Wilmer Valderrama

== Winners and nominees ==
Winners are listed first and highlighted in bold text.

=== Movies ===
| Choice Movie: Action | Choice Movie Actor: Action/Thriller |
|---|---|
| **Star Wars: Episode III – Revenge of the Sith**; The Bourne Supremacy; The Hitchhiker's Guide to the Galaxy; Kingdom of Heaven; Lords of Dogtown; Mr. & Mrs. Smith; National Treasure; Sin City | **Chad Michael Murray – House of Wax**; Orlando Bloom – Kingdom of Heaven; Jim Carrey – Lemony Snicket's A Series of Unfortunate Events; Hayden Christensen – Star Wars: Episode III – Revenge of the Sith; Matt Damon – The Bourne Supremacy; Heath Ledger – Lords of Dogtown; Matthew McConaughey – Sahara; Brad Pitt – Mr. & Mrs. Smith |
| Choice Movie Actress: Action/Thriller | Choice Movie: Drama |
| **Angelina Jolie – Mr. & Mrs. Smith**; Jessica Alba – Sin City; Penélope Cruz – Sahara; Elisha Cuthbert – House of Wax; Jennifer Garner – Elektra; Sarah Michelle Gellar – The Grudge; Keira Knightley – King Arthur; Natalie Portman – Star Wars: Episode III – Revenge of the Sith | **The Notebook**; The Aviator; Coach Carter; Finding Neverland; Friday Night Lights; Garden State; Ladder 49; The Sisterhood of the Traveling Pants |
| Choice Movie Actor: Drama | Choice Movie Actress: Drama |
| **Ryan Gosling – The Notebook**; Zach Braff – Garden State; Tom Cruise – Collateral; Johnny Depp – Finding Neverland; Leonardo DiCaprio – The Aviator; Jamie Foxx – Ray; Samuel L. Jackson – Coach Carter; Joaquin Phoenix – Ladder 49 | **Rachel McAdams – The Notebook**; Alexis Bledel – The Sisterhood of the Traveling Pants; Scarlett Johansson – In Good Company; Brittany Murphy – Little Black Book; Natalie Portman – Garden State and Closer; Amber Tamblyn – The Sisterhood of the Traveling Pants; Kerry Washington – Ray; Kate Winslet – Finding Neverland |
| Choice Movie: Comedy | Choice Movie Actor: Comedy |
| **Napoleon Dynamite**; Are We There Yet?; Guess Who; Hitch; Kicking & Screaming; The Longest Yard; Meet the Fockers; The Pacifier | **Will Smith – Hitch**; Vin Diesel – The Pacifier; Jimmy Fallon – Fever Pitch; Will Ferrell – Anchorman: The Legend of Ron Burgundy and Kicking & Screaming; Jon Heder – Napoleon Dynamite; Ashton Kutcher – Guess Who and A Lot like Love; Adam Sandler – The Longest Yard; Ben Stiller – Meet the Fockers |
| Choice Movie Actress: Comedy | Choice Date Movie |
| **Sandra Bullock – Miss Congeniality 2: Armed and Fabulous**; Drew Barrymore – Fever Pitch; Hilary Duff – A Cinderella Story; Lindsay Lohan – Herbie: Fully Loaded; Jennifer Lopez – Monster-in-Law; Eva Mendes – Hitch; Amanda Peet – A Lot like Love; Queen Latifah – Beauty Shop | **The Notebook**; A Cinderella Story; Fever Pitch; Guess Who; Hitch; A Lot like Love; Monster-in-Law; Mr. & Mrs. Smith |
| Choice Movie: Thriller | Choice Movie: Animated/Computer Generated |
| **House of Wax**; The Amityville Horror; Constantine; The Grudge; Hide and Seek; The Ring Two; Saw; The Village | **Shrek 2**; Fat Albert; The Incredibles; Madagascar; Racing Stripes; Robots; Shark Tale; Team America: World Police |
| Choice Movie: Villain | Choice Movie: Sleazebag |
| **Jim Carrey – Lemony Snicket's A Series of Unfortunate Events**; Gisele Bündchen – Taxi; Hayden Christensen – Star Wars: Episode III – Revenge of the Sith; James Cromwell – The Longest Yard; Tom Cruise – Collateral; Ian McDiarmid – Star Wars: Episode III – Revenge of the Sith; Alfred Molina – Spider-Man 2; Elijah Wood – Sin City | **Jennifer Coolidge – A Cinderella Story**; Kevin Bacon – Beauty Shop; Brian Bosworth – The Longest Yard; Will Ferrell – Kicking & Screaming; Jane Fonda – Monster-in-Law; Jon Gries – Napoleon Dynamite; Johnny Knoxville – Lords of Dogtown; Vince Vaughn – Be Cool |
| Choice Movie: Male Breakout Star | Choice Movie: Female Breakout Star |
| **Ryan Gosling – The Notebook**; Zach Braff – Garden State; Jon Heder – Napoleon Dynamite; Emile Hirsch – Lords of Dogtown; Jared Padalecki – House of Wax; Michael Rady – The Sisterhood of the Traveling Pants; Victor Rasuk – Lords of Dogtown; Bob Sapp – The Longest Yard | **Haylie Duff – Napoleon Dynamite**; Ashanti – Coach Carter; Jenna Boyd – The Sisterhood of the Traveling Pants; Gisele Bündchen – Taxi; America Ferrera – The Sisterhood of the Traveling Pants; Paris Hilton – House of Wax; Blake Lively – The Sisterhood of the Traveling Pants; Zoe Saldaña – Guess Who |
| Choice Movie: Chemistry | Choice Movie: Liplock |
| **Ryan Gosling and Rachel McAdams – The Notebook**; Drew Barrymore and Jimmy Fallon – Fever Pitch; Hilary Duff and Chad Michael Murray – A Cinderella Story; Jane Fonda and Jennifer Lopez – Monster-in-Law; Jon Heder and Efren Ramirez – Napoleon Dynamite; Angelina Jolie and Brad Pitt – Mr. & Mrs. Smith; Ashton Kutcher and Bernie Mac – Guess Who; Chris Rock and Adam Sandler – The Longest Yard | **Ryan Gosling and Rachel McAdams – The Notebook**; Drew Barrymore and Jimmy Fallon – Fever Pitch; Orlando Bloom and Eva Green – Kingdom of Heaven; Zach Braff and Natalie Portman – Garden State; Penélope Cruz and Matthew McConaughey – Sahara; Hilary Duff and Chad Michael Murray – A Cinderella Story; Kevin James and Will Smith – Hitch; Angelina Jolie and Brad Pitt – Mr. & Mrs. Smith |
| Choice Movie: Rap Artist | Choice Movie: Hissy Fit |
| **Nelly – The Longest Yard**; André 3000 – Be Cool; Ice Cube – XXX: State of the Union; Ja Rule – Assault on Precinct 13; LL Cool J – Mindhunters; Ludacris – Crash; Mos Def – The Hitchhiker's Guide to the Galaxy; Queen Latifah – Beauty Shop | **Jon Heder – Napoleon Dynamite**; Courteney Cox – The Longest Yard; Jimmy Fallon – Fever Pitch; Will Ferrell – Kicking & Screaming; America Ferrera – The Sisterhood of the Traveling Pants; Jane Fonda – Monster-in-Law; Ashton Kutcher – Guess Who; Queen Latifah – Beauty Shop |
| Choice Movie: Rumble | Choice Movie: Liar |
| **Brad Pitt vs. Angelina Jolie – Mr. & Mrs. Smith**; Elisha Cuthbert and Chad Michael Murray vs. Brian Van Holt – House of Wax; Will Ferrell vs. other newscasters – Anchorman: The Legend of Ron Burgundy; Jon Heder vs. Jon Gries – Napoleon Dynamite; Ashton Kutcher vs. Bernie Mac – Guess Who; Ewan McGregor vs. General Grievous – Star Wars: Episode III – Revenge of the Sith; Stone Cold Steve Austin vs. Bob Sapp – The Longest Yard; Z-boys vs. Diner owner – Lords of Dogtown | **Angelina Jolie – Mr. & Mrs. Smith**; Jim Carrey – Lemony Snicket's A Series of Unfortunate Events; Jane Fonda – Monster-in-Law; Jon Heder – Napoleon Dynamite; Ashton Kutcher – Guess Who; Brad Pitt – Mr. & Mrs. Smith; Natalie Portman – Garden State; Ben Stiller – Meet the Fockers |
| Choice Movie: Blush Scene | Choice Movie: Dance Scene |
| **Hilary Duff at the school rally – A Cinderella Story**; Zach Braff is the object of a dog's affection – Garden State; Jon Gries tells Jon Heder's crush he wets the bed – Napoleon Dynamite; Ashton Kutcher gets caught with girlfriend's lingerie – Guess Who; Adam Sandler's makeout scene – The Longest Yard; Will Smith's allergic reaction – Hitch; Ben Stiller's engagement party speech – Meet the Fockers; Renée Zellweger lands in a pig pen – Bridget Jones: The Edge of Reason | **Jon Heder onstage at Pedro's election rally – Napoleon Dynamite**; Sandra Bullock and Regina King as Vegas showgirls – Miss Congeniality 2: Armed and Fabulous; Richard Gere and Jennifer Lopez – Shall We Dance?; Ryan Gosling and Rachel McAdams dance in the street – The Notebook; Seth Green choreographs the video shoot – Be Cool; Angelina Jolie and Brad Pitt do the tango – Mr. & Mrs. Smith; Ashton Kutcher teaches Bernie Mac how to waltz – Guess Who; Will Smith teaches Kevin James how to dance – Hitch |
| Choice Movie: Rockstar Moment | Choice Movie: Love Scene |
| **Ashton Kutcher sings "I'll Be There for You" – A Lot like Love**; John Cho and Kal Penn sing "Hold On" – Harold & Kumar Go to White Castle; Jimmy Fallon sings "This Will Be (An Everlasting Love)" – Taxi; Bernie Mac sings his vows to his wife – Guess Who; The Rock making a music video – Be Cool; Aaron Ruell sings at his wedding – Napoleon Dynamite; Will Smith sings "Reasons" while on allergy medication – Hitch; Renée Zellweger sings "Like a Virgin" – Bridget Jones: The Edge of Reason | **Ryan Gosling and Rachel McAdams on the bridge – The Notebook**; Alexis Bledel tells Michael Rady she loves him – The Sisterhood of the Traveling Pants; Orlando Bloom and Eva Green kiss – Kingdom of Heaven; Zach Braff stays in New Jersey for Natalie Portman – Garden State; Jimmy Fallon gets on one knee for Drew Barrymore – Fever Pitch; Jon Heder and Tina Majorino at the high school dance – Napoleon Dynamite; Chad Michael Murray and Hilary Duff's dance scene – A Cinderella Story; Will Smith tells Eva Mendes he loves her – Hitch |
| Choice Summer Movie | Choice Movie: Scary Scene |
| **Wedding Crashers**; Bad News Bears; Batman Begins; Bewitched; Charlie and the Chocolate Factory; Dark Water; Fantastic Four; Herbie: Fully Loaded; Hustle & Flow; The Island; Land of the Dead; War of the Worlds | **Ryan Reynolds in the bathtub – The Amityville Horror**; The deer scene – The Ring Two; Demon grabs Stellan Skarsgård in the cave – Exorcist: The Beginning; Bryce Dallas Howard waits at the door for Joaquin Phoenix – The Village; Michael Keaton stares at his TV static when spirits disappear – White Noise; Killer grabs Angelina Jolie through the mattress – Taking Lives; Julianne Moore sees the alien gets sucked into the sky – The Forgotten; KaDee Strickland hides under the covers from the ghost – The Grudge |
| Choice Movie: Scream Scene | |
**Paris Hilton - Paige screams when she's being chased by the killer – House of Wax**; “The Alien" screams when Julianne Moore (Telly) shatters the windows – The Forgotten; Rachel Nichols - Lisa screams as she's locked in the closet – The Amityville Horror; Yuya Ozeki - Toshio Saeki screams in the attic – The Grudge; Elisabeth Shue - Elizabeth screams when the killer comes out of the closet – Hide and Seek; Naomi Watts - Rachel screams when she discovers her son is possessed – The Ring Two; Rachel Weisz - Angela Dodson screams as she is pulled out of building by spirits – Constantine; Leigh Whannell - Adam screams as he's being locked in the room – Saw

=== Television ===
| Choice TV Show: Drama | Choice TV Actor: Drama |
|---|---|
| **The O.C.**; 7th Heaven; Alias; Everwood; Grey's Anatomy; House; Lost; One Tree Hill | **Adam Brody – The O.C.**; Matthew Fox – Lost; Tyler Hoechlin – 7th Heaven; Jesse McCartney – Summerland; Ben McKenzie – The O.C.; Chad Michael Murray – One Tree Hill; Gregory Smith – Everwood; Tom Welling – Smallville |
| Choice TV Actress: Drama | Choice TV Show: Comedy |
| **Rachel Bilson – The O.C.**; Mischa Barton – The O.C.; Hilarie Burton – One Tree Hill; Sophia Bush – One Tree Hill; Jennifer Garner – Alias; Evangeline Lilly – Lost; Beverly Mitchell – 7th Heaven; Emily VanCamp – Everwood | **Gilmore Girls**; Desperate Housewives; Family Guy; Scrubs; The Simpsons; That '70s Show; That's So Raven; What I Like About You |
| Choice TV Actor: Comedy | Choice TV Actress: Comedy |
| **Ashton Kutcher – That '70s Show**; Zach Braff – Scrubs; Marques Houston – Cuts; Matt LeBlanc – Joey; Bernie Mac – The Bernie Mac Show; Seth MacFarlane – Family Guy; Jesse Metcalfe – Desperate Housewives; Frankie Muniz – Malcolm in the Middle | **Alexis Bledel – Gilmore Girls**; Pamela Anderson – Stacked; Amanda Bynes – What I Like About You; Eve – Eve; JoAnna Garcia – Reba; Mila Kunis – That '70s Show; Eva Longoria – Desperate Housewives; Raven – That's So Raven |
| Choice TV Show: Reality | Choice TV: Male Reality/Variety Star |
| **American Idol**; America's Next Top Model; The Ashlee Simpson Show; Britney & Kevin: Chaotic; Fear Factor; Growing Up Gotti; Punk'd; The Simple Life: Interns | **Bo Bice – American Idol**; Travis Barker – Meet the Barkers; Stephen Colletti – Laguna Beach: The Real Orange County; Kevin Federline – Britney & Kevin: Chaotic; The Gotti Brothers – Growing Up Gotti; Bam Margera – Viva La Bam; Rob Mariano – The Amazing Race; Tom Westman – Survivor: Palau |
| Choice TV: Female Reality/Variety Star | Choice TV: Breakout Show |
| **Carrie Underwood – American Idol**; Brittney Gastineau – Gastineau Girls; Victoria Gotti – Growing Up Gotti; Stephenie LaGrossa – Survivor: Palau; Amber Mariano – The Amazing Race 7; Shanna Moakler – Meet the Barkers; Naima Mora – America's Next Top Model; Kendra Todd – The Apprentice | **Desperate Housewives**; Beauty and the Geek; Entourage; House; Lost; Unfabulous; Veronica Mars; Zoey 101 |
| Choice TV: Male Breakout Star | Choice TV: Female Breakout Star |
| **Jesse Metcalfe – Desperate Housewives**; Justin Chambers – Grey's Anatomy; Matt Czuchry – Gilmore Girls; Jorge Garcia – Lost; Tyler Hilton – One Tree Hill; Josh Holloway – Lost; Ian Somerhalder – Lost; Jesse Spencer – House | **Eva Longoria – Desperate Housewives**; Kristen Bell – Veronica Mars; Maggie Grace – Lost; Evangeline Lilly – Lost; Mia Maestro – Alias; Ellen Pompeo – Grey's Anatomy; Emma Roberts – Unfabulous; Jamie Lynn Spears – Zoey 101 |
| Choice TV: Chemistry | Choice TV: Sidekick |
| **Adam Brody and Rachel Bilson – The O.C.**; Mischa Barton and Ben McKenzie – The O.C.; Alexis Bledel and Matt Czuchry – Gilmore Girls; Matthew Fox and Evangeline Lilly – Lost; Jennifer Garner and Michael Vartan – Alias; Brian Griffin and Stewie Griffin – Family Guy; James Lafferty and Chad Michael Murray – One Tree Hill; Gregory Smith and Emily VanCamp – Everwood | **Wilmer Valderrama – That '70s Show**; Donald Faison – Scrubs; Jorge Garcia – Lost; Brian Griffin, the Dog – Family Guy; Sean Hayes – Will & Grace; Allison Mack – Smallville; Chris Pratt – Everwood; Kevin Weisman – Alias |
| Choice TV: Male Personality | Choice TV: Female Personality |
| **Ashton Kutcher**; Simon Cowell; Nick Lachey; Mark McGrath; P. Diddy; Ty Pennington; Ryan Seacrest; Xzibit | **Jessica Simpson**; Paula Abdul; Tyra Banks; Missy Elliott; Paris Hilton; Nicole Richie; Ashlee Simpson; Britney Spears |
| Choice TV: Parental Unit | Choice Summer TV Show |
| **Lauren Graham – Gilmore Girls**; Stephen Collins and Catherine Hicks – 7th Heaven; Peter Gallagher and Kelly Rowan – The O.C.; Victor Garber, Lena Olin and Ron Rifkin – Alias; Moira Kelly – One Tree Hill; Annette O'Toole and John Schneider – Smallville; Homer and Marge Simpson – The Simpsons; Treat Williams – Everwood | **Degrassi: The Next Generation**; American Dad!; The Andy Milonakis Show; Beauty and the Geek; Big Brother; Brat Camp; Dancing with the Stars; Hell's Kitchen; Laguna Beach: The Real Orange County; The Princes of Malibu; The Real World: Austin; Viva La Bam |

=== Music ===
| Choice Music: Male Artist | Choice Music: Female Artist |
|---|---|
| **Jesse McCartney**; 50 Cent; Eminem; The Game; Jack Johnson; John Legend; Snoop Dogg; Rob Thomas | **Kelly Clarkson**; Mariah Carey; Ciara; Alicia Keys; Avril Lavigne; Ashlee Simpson; Britney Spears; Gwen Stefani |
| Choice Music: R&B Artist | Choice Music: Rap Artist |
| **Mariah Carey**; Ciara; Fantasia; Alicia Keys; John Legend; Mario; Omarion; Usher | **Eminem**; 50 Cent; The Game; Jay Z; Lil Jon; Ludacris; Snoop Dogg; Kanye West |
| Choice Music: Rock Group | Choice Music: Single |
| **Simple Plan**; 3 Doors Down; Coldplay; Franz Ferdinand; Green Day; Jimmy Eat World; The Killers; Velvet Revolver | **"Since U Been Gone" – Kelly Clarkson**; "Beautiful Soul" – Jesse McCartney; "Boulevard of Broken Dreams" – Green Day; "Candy Shop" – 50 Cent; "Drop It Like It's Hot" – Snoop Dogg featuring Pharrell; "Hollaback Girl" – Gwen Stefani; "Lonely No More" – Rob Thomas; "She Will Be Loved" – Maroon 5 |
| Choice Music: Album | Choice Music: R&B/Hip-Hop Track |
| **Breakaway – Kelly Clarkson**; ...Something to Be – Rob Thomas; American Idiot – Green Day; The Diary of Alicia Keys – Alicia Keys; The Documentary – The Game; Love. Angel. Music. Baby. – Gwen Stefani; The Massacre – 50 Cent; Songs About Jane – Maroon 5 | **"1, 2 Step" – Ciara featuring Missy Elliott**; "1 Thing" – Amerie; "Caught Up" – Usher; "Get Right" – Jennifer Lopez; "It's Like That" – Mariah Carey; "Let Me Love You" – Mario; "Soldier" – Destiny's Child featuring T.I. and Lil Wayne; "Touch" – Omarion |
| Choice Music: Rap Track | Choice Music: Rock Track |
| **"Mockingbird" – Eminem**; "Bring 'Em Out" – T.I.; "Candy Shop" – 50 Cent featuring Olivia; "Drop It Like It's Hot" – Snoop Dogg featuring Pharrell; "How We Do" – The Game featuring 50 Cent; "Lovers and Friends" – Lil Jon and The East Side Boyz featuring Usher and Ludacris; "Number One Spot" – Ludacris; "Wait (The Whisper Song)" – Ying Yang Twins | **"Boulevard of Broken Dreams" – Green Day**; "Beverly Hills" – Weezer; "I Don't Want to Be" – Gavin DeGraw; "Let Me Go" – 3 Doors Down; "Mr. Brightside" – The Killers; "Pain" – Jimmy Eat World; "Scars" – Papa Roach; "She Will Be Loved" – Maroon 5 |
| Choice Music: Love Song | Choice Music: Male Breakout Artist |
| **"We Belong Together" – Mariah Carey**; "Beautiful Soul" – Jesse McCartney; "Cater 2 U" – Destiny's Child; "Incomplete" – Backstreet Boys; "Let Me Love You" – Mario; "Slow Down" – Bobby Valentino; "Sunday Morning" – Maroon 5; "You and Me" – Lifehouse | **Jesse McCartney**; Ryan Cabrera; Gavin DeGraw; Frankie J; The Game; John Legend; T.I.; Rob Thomas |
| Choice Music: Female Breakout Artist | Choice Music: Party Starter |
| **Gwen Stefani**; Amerie; Ciara; Fantasia; Lindsay Lohan; Natalie; Ashlee Simpson; Brooke Valentine | **"Don't Phunk with My Heart" – The Black Eyed Peas**; "1, 2 Step" – Ciara featuring Missy Elliott; "Candy Shop" – 50 Cent featuring Olivia; "Caught Up" – Usher; "Disco Inferno" – 50 Cent; "Drop It Like It's Hot" – Snoop Dogg featuring Pharrell; "Get Right" – Jennifer Lopez; "Oye Mi Canto" – N.O.R.E. featuring Nina Sky, Daddy Yankee, Big Mato and Gemstar |
| Choice Music: Collaboration | Choice Music: Make-Out Song |
| **"Rich Girl" – Gwen Stefani featuring Eve**; "1, 2 Step" – Ciara featuring Missy Elliott; "Drop It Like It's Hot" – Snoop Dogg featuring Pharrell; "How We Do" – The Game featuring 50 Cent; "MJB da MVP" – Mary J. Blige featuring The Game and 50 Cent; "Numb/Encore" – Linkin Park and Jay Z; "Over and Over" – Nelly featuring Tim McGraw; "Signs" – Snoop Dogg featuring Charlie Wilson and Justin Timberlake | **"Oh" – Ciara featuring Ludacris**; "Grind with Me" – Pretty Ricky; "Just a Lil Bit" – 50 Cent; "Naked" – Marques Houston; "O" – Omarion; "Obsession (No Es Amor)" – Frankie J featuring Baby Bash; "U Already Know" – 112; "Wait (The Whisper Song)" – Ying Yang Twins |
| Choice Summer Song | |
**"Behind These Hazel Eyes" – Kelly Clarkson**; "Don't Phunk with My Heart" – The Black Eyed Peas; "Get It Poppin" – Fat Joe featuring Nelly; "Hollaback Girl" – Gwen Stefani; "Inside Your Heaven" – Carrie Underwood and Bo Bice; "Just a Lil Bit" – 50 Cent; "Lose Control" – Missy Elliott featuring Ciara and Fatman Scoop; "Oh" – Ciara featuring Ludacris; "Pon De Replay" – Rihanna; "These Boots Are Made For Walkin'" – Jessica Simpson; "Untitled (How Could This Happen to Me?)" – Simple Plan; "We Belong Together" – Mariah Carey

=== People ===
| Choice Male Hottie | Choice Female Hottie |
|---|---|
| **Chad Michael Murray**; Orlando Bloom; Adam Brody; Ashton Kutcher; Jesse McCartney; Jesse Metcalfe; Omarion; Usher | **Rachel Bilson**; Jessica Alba; Beyoncé; Angelina Jolie; Lindsay Lohan; Eva Longoria; Christina Milian; Jessica Simpson |
| Choice Comedian | Choice Crossover Artist |
| **Adam Sandler**; Jim Carrey; Dave Chappelle; Will Ferrell; Tina Fey; Amy Poehler; Chris Rock; Ben Stiller | **Jesse McCartney**; André 3000; Ashanti; Travis Barker; Paris Hilton; Tyler Hilton; Lindsay Lohan; Christina Milian |
| Choice Male Red Carpet Fashion Icon | Choice Female Red Carpet Fashion Icon |
| **Brad Pitt**; André 3000; Ashton Kutcher; Nick Lachey; Nelly; P. Diddy; Will Smith; Usher | **Jessica Simpson**; Jessica Alba; Mischa Barton; Jennifer Garner; Paris Hilton; Eva Longoria; Jennifer Lopez; Gwen Stefani |
| Choice It Girl | |
**Alexis Bledel**; Ashanti; Sophia Bush; Amber Tamblyn

=== Sports ===
| Choice Male Athlete | Choice Female Athlete |
|---|---|
| **Michael Phelps**; Lance Armstrong; Tom Brady; Johnny Damon; Dale Earnhardt Jr.; LeBron James; Matt Leinart; Rafael Nadal | **Mia Hamm**; Natalie Coughlin; Allyson Felix; Lisa Leslie; Misty May-Treanor and Kerri Walsh Jennings; Danica Patrick; Maria Sharapova; Michelle Wie |
| Choice Male Extreme Athlete | Choice Female Extreme Athlete |
| **Dave Mirra**; Bob Burnquist; Ricky Carmichael; Laird Hamilton; Bucky Lasek; Ryan Nyquist; Paul Rodriguez; Shaun White | **Layne Beachley**; Megan Abubo; Gretchen Bleiler; Tara Dakides; Dallas Friday; Tarah Gieger; Lyn-Z Adams Hawkins; Hannah Teter |

=== Miscellaneous ===
| Choice V-Cast | Choice Video Game |
|---|---|
| **Desperate Housewives**; 24; Alias; American Dad!; Arrested Development; Extreme Makeover: Home Edition; The Simple Life: Interns; The Simpsons | **Grand Theft Auto: San Andreas**; Halo 2; Madden NFL 2005; MLB 2006; NBA Street V3; Need for Speed: Underground 2; Spider-Man 2; Star Wars: Episode III – Revenge of the Sith |
