= 8th ALMA Awards =

2006 US film and television awards ceremony

- Date: May 7, 2006
- Site: Los Angeles, California
- Hosted by: Eva Longoria
- Official website: www.almaawards.com

Television coverage
- Network: ABC

The 8th ALMA Awards honors the accomplishments made by Latinos in film and television in 2005.

== Winners and nominees ==
Winners in bold.

Outstanding Actor in a Motion Picture

- **Michael Peña – Crash**
- Clifton Collins, Jr. – Capote
- Benicio Del Toro – Sin City

Outstanding Actress in a Motion Picture

- **Q'Orianka Kilcher – The New World**
- America Ferrera – The Sisterhood of the Traveling Pants
- Eva Mendes – Hitch

Outstanding Supporting Actress in a Motion Picture

- **Elpidia Carrillo – Nine Lives**
- Jessica Alba – Sin City
- Rosario Dawson – Rent

Outstanding Director of a Motion Picture

- **Fernando Meirelles – The Constant Gardener**
- Rodrigo Garcia – Nine Lives
- Robert Rodriguez – Sin City

Outstanding Actor in a Television Series

- **Jimmy Smits – The West Wing**
- George Lopez – George Lopez
- Edward James Olmos – Battlestar Gallactica

Outstanding Actress in a Television Series

- **Judy Reyes – Scrubs**
- Alexis Bledel – Gilmore Girls
- Belita Moreno – George Lopez

Outstanding Television Series

- **The West Wing (NBC)**

Outstanding Supporting Actor in a Television Series

- **Jorge Garcia – Lost**
- Benito Martinez – The Shield
- Amaury Nolasco – Prison Break
- Freddy Rodriguez – Six Feet Under
- Wilmer Valderrama – That 70s Show

Outstanding Supporting Actress in a Television Series

- **Michelle Rodriguez – Lost**
- Justina Machado – Six Feet Under
- Shelly Morrison – Will & Grace
- Liz Torres – Gilmore Girls
- Nadine Velazquez – My Name is Earl

Outstanding Performance in a Daytime Drama

- **Eva La Rue – All My Children**
- Kamar de Los Reyes – One Life to Live
- Melissa Gallo – One Life to Live

Outstanding Director of a Television Drama or Comedy

- **Jesús Treviño – Prison Break**
- Noberto Barba – Law & Order: Criminal Intent
- Jay Torres – Alias

Outstanding Script for a Television Drama or Comedy

- **Law & Order: Special Victims Unit for "Alien" – Jose Molina**
- George Lopez for "George Discovers Benny's Sili-Con Job" – Luisa Leschin
- That 70s Show for "Street Fighting Man" – Alan Dybner
- Freddie for "The Courtship of Freddie's Father" – Dailyn Rodriguez
- How I Met Your Mother for "The Duel" – Gloria Calderon-Kellet

Outstanding Male Musical Performer

- **Daddy Yankee**
- Ryan Cabrera
- Frankie J

Outstanding Female Musical Performer

- **Shakira**
- Mariah Carey
- Jennifer Lopez

Spanish Album of the Year

- **Fijación Oral Vol. 1 by Shakira**
- Cautivo by Chayanne
- Diez by Intocable

Person of the Year

- **Eva Longoria**

Anthony Quinn Award for Excellence in Motion Pictures

- **Andy García**

Celia Cruz Award for Excellence in Music

- **Marc Anthony**

Special Achievement for Children's Programming

- **Maya & Miguel**

Special Achievement in Diversity Programming

- **ABC**
