= Girls in Pants: The Third Summer of the Sisterhood =

2005 novel by Ann Brashares

- First edition
- Author: Ann Brashares
- Language: English
- Series: The Sisterhood of the Traveling Pants
- Release number: 3
- Genre: Fiction
- Publisher: Delacorte Press
- Publication date: 2005
- Publication place: United States
- Media type: Print
- Pages: 338
- Awards: Quill Award
- ISBN: 0-385-72935-9
- OCLC: 859074176
- LC Class: PZ7.B73759
- Preceded by: The Second Summer of the Sisterhood
- Followed by: Forever in Blue: The Fourth Summer of the Sisterhood

Girls in Pants: The Third Summer of the Sisterhood (also known as Girls in Pants), published in 2005, is the third in a series of five books The Sisterhood of the Traveling Pants (2001), The Second Summer of the Sisterhood (2003), Forever in Blue (2007), and Sisterhood Everlasting (2011). The books are written by American author Ann Brashares.

The novel was one of three in the series adapted into a film, The Sisterhood of the Traveling Pants 2 (2008).

== Plot summary ==
During the Sisterhood's final summer before college, they all find themselves struggling with their identities, love, and relationships.

=== Lena ===
Following the death of Lena's grandfather, her grandmother Valia moves in with the Kaligaris family. Valia is homesick and sad, and, as a result, constantly complains and makes Lena's home life very tense. Lena's one solace is the figure drawing class she is taking at an art school, despite her parents' wishes that she choose a more practical interest. However, when her father comes into the class and sees her drawing a nude model, he forbids her from taking the class and announces that he will not pay for Lena to go to the Rhode Island School of Design.

The class's instructor, Annik Marchand, advises Lena to try for a scholarship. Lena makes a portfolio of drawings of her family, as well as Paul Rodman, who comes to stay with Carmen. Through her drawings, Lena learns more about her family: her sister Effie's anger that Lena is leaving for college, her mother's struggle between Lena's wishes and her father's, her father's fear of Lena entering a world he is unfamiliar with, and her grandmother's wishes that someone pay attention to her misery instead of simply ignoring it.

At the end of the summer, Lena mails in her portfolio and receives word that she has gotten the scholarship. She tells her father and receives his permission to attend art school.

=== Tibby ===
Brian asks Tibby to the senior party as his date. Although she realizes she has also developed feelings for him, she worries about changing their relationship and opening herself up to him. At the end of the night, Brian kisses her and tells her that he loves her.

The next morning, Tibby's sister Katherine falls out a window and injures her head while Tibby is supposed to be watching her. Tibby is thrown into a depression and blames herself for the accident, feeling guilty about her resentment of her younger siblings. She begins to avoid Brian, believing that the accident wouldn't have happened if she hadn't been thinking about him, and worrying that the accident is a sign that taking chances will only end in suffering.

Towards the end of the novel, Tibby becomes Christina's unwilling labor partner and helps her be brave enough to have the baby without her husband and Carmen present. This encourages Tibby to be brave herself and confront her feelings for Brian instead of shying away from them, and they begin a relationship.

=== Bridget ===
Bridget takes a summer job at a youth soccer camp in Pennsylvania and is shocked to discover that one of her fellow coaches is none other than Eric. She plans to avoid him after learning that he has a girlfriend, but her plan is shot down when they are partnered as camp counsellors, causing them to see each other constantly. Not wanting to upset Eric, Bridget selflessly puts her feelings aside and tries to respect his relationship. The two eventually develop a friendship despite Bridget’s uncertainties.

When Bridget comes down with a high fever, Eric carries her to his cabin and takes care of her. They fall asleep together, and Bridget wakes up to find Eric holding her. When she tries to break the hold quietly, he wakes up; soon afterwards, he leaves the camp for several days without explanation. Feeling confused and betrayed, Bridget decides that she won’t continue to vie for his attention anymore. She trains her soccer team hard, and they go on to defeat Eric’s team in the camp championship.

Towards the end of camp, Bridget confronts Eric, who reveals that he returned to New York to break up with his girlfriend due to his feelings for Bridget. He tells her that he thinks they were always meant to be, and they reunite.

=== Carmen ===
Carmen is stressed out by her mother’s pregnancy and her job watching a cranky and sullen Valia. She worries that her family will move on without her when she leaves for college, and considers attending the University of Maryland instead of her first choice, Williams College, so that she can stay close to home and retain a part of her old life.

While taking Valia to the hospital one day, Carmen meets Win Sawyer, a college student who volunteers at the hospital. They develop a mutual attraction, but Carmen fears that Win only likes her because he only ever sees her kind and selfless side — which she calls "Good Carmen" — and is afraid of letting him see her less attractive personality traits.

When Christina goes into labor four weeks early, Carmen enlists Tibby to stay with her mother, and Win accompanies her to find her stepfather David, who is out of town on a work trip. Christina gives birth to a baby boy, who Carmen names Ryan. After the baby is born, Win and Carmen finally kiss and leave the hospital hand in hand. Carmen decides to attend Williams after all, realizing that "Good Carmen" is a part of her, not a different person, and that there will always be a place for her in her family. She also convinces Lena's parents to let Valia return to Greece.

== Reception ==
In a starred review, Booklist's Frances Bradburn indicated that "readers of the other books won't be disappointed with these new adventures". Bradburn further highlighted the novel, writing, "Beneath these crisis-ridden plotlines lies an artist at work--an author who encourages her readers to look, feel, trust, and empathize with her characters".

Multiple reviewers discussed the continued development of the series's four main characters, who referred to as "fully developed, strikingly different, [and] equally fascinating". Similarly, by Lisa Armitage, writing for the Journal of Adolescent & Adult Literacy, highlighted how each of the girls has "her own distinct yet realistic personality". Armitage also found the characters "to be excellent role models for preteen and teenage girls as they work through their problems and make educated and responsible decisions". Publishers Weekly also noted that "the girls are [...] wonderfully drawn, with all their realistic faults".

Armitage further praised Brashares for including plot lines that discuss "the heartaches and joys of being young women but without the quick fixes and happily-ever-afters so common in other young adult literature". However, Horn Book Magazine's Jennifer M. Brabander found that "Brashares too obviously spells out the lessons each [girl] learns".

Publishers Weekly praised Brashares for "expertly splic[ing] together each friend's struggle with growing up". While School Library Journal's Linda L. Plevak found that the "abrupt" switches between chapters built suspense, they also indicated that "reluctant readers may miss having more solid transitions".

In addition to the overarching premise regarding a pair of pants that fits four differently-shaped teenage girls, Publishers Weekly critiqued "a couple of plot points [that] strain credibility".
