= List of awards and nominations received by Alexis Bledel =

Alexis Bledel awards and nominations
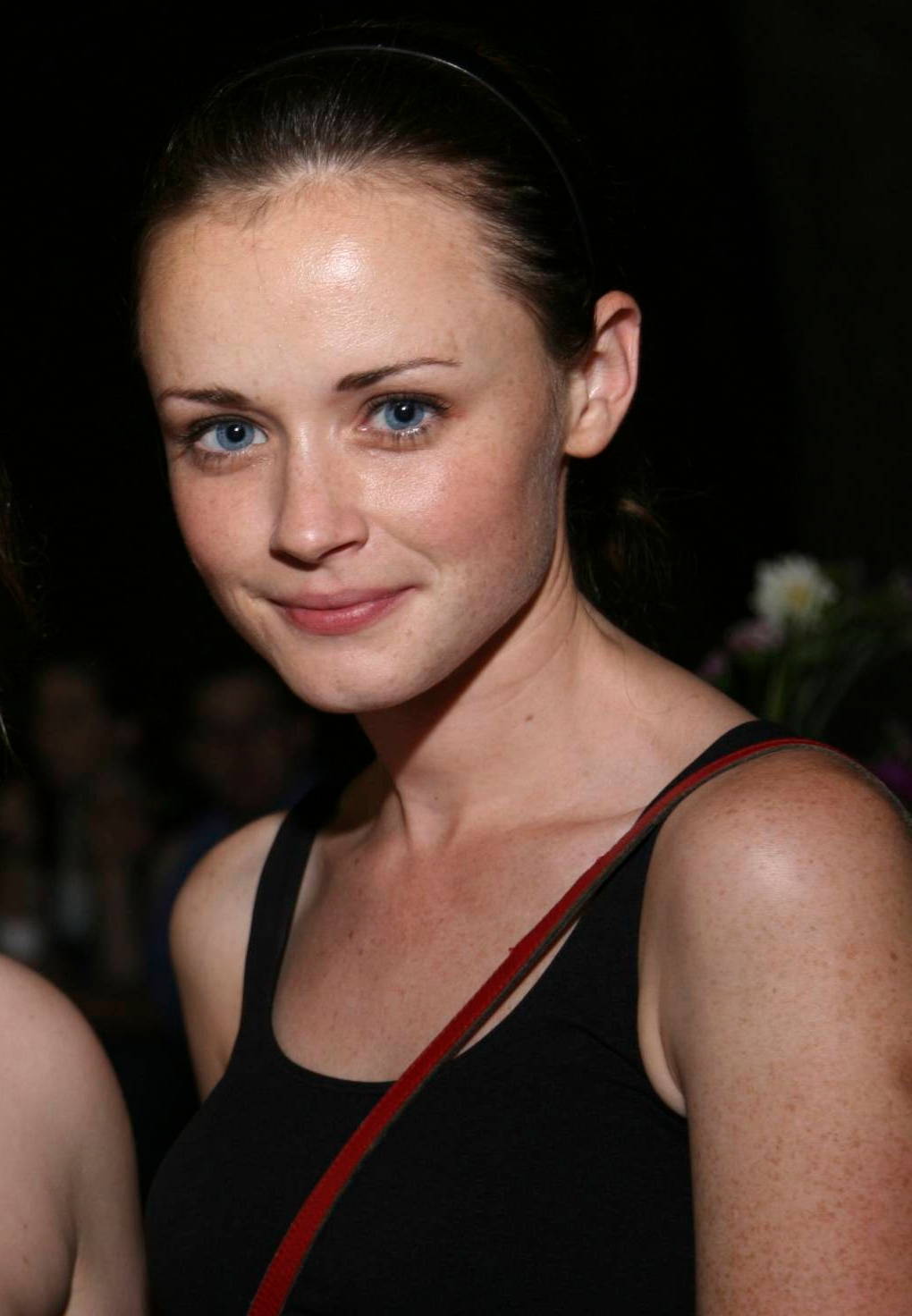
- Bledel in 2008
Award	Wins	Nominations
Primetime Emmy Awards	1	4
Screen Actors Guild Awards	0	4

American actress Alexis Bledel has received various awards and nominations for her work. For her role in Gilmore Girls, she received nominations for Satellite, Teen Choice and Young Artist Awards. For her role in The Handmaid's Tale she has received four Primetime Emmy Award nominations winning Outstanding Guest Actress in a Drama Series. She has also received three Screen Actors Guild Award nominations for Outstanding Ensemble Cast in a Drama Series.

== Major associations ==
=== Primetime Emmy Awards ===
Year	Category	Nominated work	Result	Ref.
2017	Outstanding Guest Actress in a Drama Series	The Handmaid's Tale	Won	
2018	Outstanding Supporting Actress in a Drama Series	The Handmaid's Tale	Nominated	
2020	Outstanding Guest Actress in a Drama Series	The Handmaid's Tale	Nominated	
2021	Outstanding Guest Actress in a Drama Series	The Handmaid's Tale	Nominated	

=== Screen Actors Guild Awards ===
Year	Category	Nominated work	Result	Ref.
2017	Outstanding Ensemble Cast in a Drama Series	The Handmaids Tale	Nominated	
2018	Outstanding Ensemble Cast in a Drama Series	The Handmaids Tale	Nominated	
2019	Outstanding Ensemble Cast in a Drama Series	The Handmaids Tale	Nominated	
2021	Outstanding Ensemble Cast in a Drama Series	The Handmaids Tale	Nominated	

== Miscellaneous awards ==
=== ALMA Awards ===
Year	Category	Nominated work	Result	Ref.
2006	Outstanding Actress in a Television Series	Gilmore Girls	Nominated	

=== Critics' Choice Movie Awards ===
Year	Category	Nominated work	Result	Ref.
2006	Best Acting Ensemble	Sin City	Nominated	

=== Saturn Awards ===
Year	Category	Nominated work	Result	Ref.
2003	Best Performance by a Younger Actor	Tuck Everlasting	Nominated	

=== Satellite Awards ===
Year	Category	Nominated work	Result	Ref.
2003	Best Actress in a Series, Comedy or Musical	Gilmore Girls	Nominated	

=== Teen Choice Awards ===
Year	Category	Nominated work	Result	Ref.
2001	TV – Choice Actress	Gilmore Girls	Nominated	
2002	TV – Choice Drama Actress	Gilmore Girls	Nominated	
2004	TV – Choice Comedy Actress	Gilmore Girls	Nominated	
2005	TV – Choice Comedy Actress	Gilmore Girls	Won	
2005	Choice TV Chemistry	Gilmore Girls	Nominated	
2005	Choice Movie Love Scene	The Sisterhood of the Traveling Pants	Nominated	
2005	Movie – Choice Drama Actress	The Sisterhood of the Traveling Pants	Nominated	
2006	TV – Choice Comedy Actress	Gilmore Girls	Won	
2006	Choice TV Chemistry	Gilmore Girls	Nominated	

=== Young Artist Award ===
Year	Category	Nominated work	Result	Ref.
2001	Best Leading Young Actress - TV Drama Series	Gilmore Girls	Won	
2002	Best Supporting Young Actress - TV Drama Series	Gilmore Girls	Nominated	

== Online awards ==
=== OFTA Television Award ===
Year	Category	Nominated work	Result	Ref.
2002	Best Supporting Actress in a Comedy Series	Gilmore Girls	Nominated	
2017	Best Guest Actress in a Drama Series	The Handmaids Tale	Won	

=== Family Television Awards ===
Year	Category	Nominated work	Result	Ref.
2002	Best Actress	Gilmore Girls	Won	

=== Gold Derby Awards ===
Year	Category	Nominated work	Result	Ref.
2012	Drama Guest Actress	Mad Men	Won	
2017	Drama Guest Actress	The Handmaids Tale	Won	
