= My Name Is Memory =

Novel by Ann Brashares

- Hardcover Edition
- Author: Ann Brashares
- Language: English, French, Polish, Chinese, Indonesian, Serbian
- Genre: Young adult
- Publisher: Riverhead Books
- Publication date: June 2010
- Publication place: United States
- Media type: Print (Hardback & Paperback)
- Pages: 324 pp
- ISBN: 978-1594487583

My Name is Memory is a novel written in 2010 by Ann Brashares, author of the best-selling young adult series The Sisterhood of the Traveling Pants. The novel is centered on a mysterious young boy named Daniel, and Sophia, the girl he has spent lifetimes searching for; as he races against time to spur her lost memories of him before his vengeful, centuries-old brother Joaquim finds them. The story has been optioned for film.

== Plot summary ==
Daniel can remember things from his past lives going back to a life that started near Antioch in 520 A.D. In that early life he joins his brother to raid a village in North Africa. During the raid Daniel kills a young girl but is haunted by his actions. About 30 years later, a young boy realizes he can remember his previous life as Daniel and is still bothered by his actions during the raid. He lives and dies as part of an otherwise eventual life. In his third life in Constantinople Daniel can remember his previous two lives and has two chance meetings with a woman he recognizes as being the reincarnation of the girl he had killed in 541 A.D.

In 773, now in Pergamum, Asia Minor his brother Joaquim brings home Joaquim's new wife. Daniel recognizes her as the same person he had killed in 541 and met briefly two lifetimes later. Her name is Sophia though she does not recall previous lives the way Daniel does. Daniel also recognizes that Joaquim was also his brother in the first lifetime that Daniel can remember. Joaquim is very cruel towards those around him, including Sophia. While he can recall past lives Joaquim does not have the ability to recognize other "old souls" and so is not aware Daniel that he knew Daniel before nor who Sophia was in an earlier life. Daniel helps Sophia escape from Joaquim's mistreatment and as a result is murdered by Joaquim.

In this story it appears that roughly half a dozen people worldwide have memories like Daniel and Joaquim. In 899 while living and working as a sailor Daniel meets Ben who is fellow sailor. Ben can apparently recall past lives much further back than Daniel and can also remember the future. Ben and Daniel form a friendship that continues to present time though occasionally there were gaps of hundreds of years in which their lives did not intersect. Ben also helps Daniel in dealing with Joaquim who can hijack another person's body by kicking the person's soul out.

The chapters about Daniel alternate with chapters about Lucy, a high school senior in 2009, and later in the book a college student and young adult. While she does not know it, Lucy was Sophia in an earlier life. The time lines for Daniel and Lucy converge with Lucy initially not recalling her previous lives and times with Daniel. Joaquim reenters the story intent on vengeance against Daniel for helping Sophia escape Joaquim's abuse more than 1000 years earlier.

The story ends with Lucy temporarily safe in Ben's care while Daniel goes to fight with Joaquim.
