= The Sisterhood of the Traveling Pants (novel) =

2001 novel by Ann Brashares

- First edition
- Author: Ann Brashares
- Cover artist: Melon B
- Language: English
- Series: The Sisterhood of the Traveling Pants
- Genre: Young adult novel
- Published: September 11, 2001, Delacorte Press
- Publication place: United States
- Media type: Print (Hardback & Paperback)
- Pages: 320 pp
- ISBN: 0-385-72933-2
- OCLC: 47923895
- LC Class: PZ7.B73759 Si 2001
- Followed by: The Second Summer of the Sisterhood

The Sisterhood of the Traveling Pants is a young adult novel by Ann Brashares published in 2001. It follows the adventures of four best friends — Lena Kaligaris, Tibby Rollins, Bridget Vreeland, and Carmen Lowell, who will be spending their first summer apart when a magical pair of jeans comes into their lives, turning their summer upside down. The book was adapted into a film of the same name in 2005. Four sequels to the book have been published, The Second Summer of the Sisterhood; Girls in Pants: The Third Summer of the Sisterhood; Forever in Blue: The Fourth Summer of the Sisterhood; and Sisterhood Everlasting.

== Plot summary ==
High school students Lena Kaligaris, Tibby Rollins, Bridget Vreeland, and Carmen Lowell have been best friends since birth. The summer before their junior year, Carmen buys a pair of jeans at a thrift shop that mysteriously fits each girl perfectly, despite their different sizes. This leads them to believe that the pants are magical. They share the "traveling pants" among themselves over the summer while they are separated.

Lena spends the summer with her grandparents in Santorini. During her stay, her grandmother attempts to set her up with Kostos Dounas, the neighbours' grandson. Kostos takes an interest in Lena, who eventually returns the notion. However, when he accidentally catches her skinny-dipping, a misunderstanding leads Lena's grandparents to believe that Kostos attempted to assault her, resulting in an argument between the Kaligaris and Dounas families. When she realizes what has happened, Lena explains the truth to her grandparents in order to repair the rift between the families, and confesses to Kostos that she is in love with him.

Tibby spends the summer working at a Wallman's store, planning to film a satirical documentary of her experiences. She meets Bailey, a 12-year-old girl who has been diagnosed with leukemia, when the latter faints at the store. Bailey soon befriends Tibby, helping her film her documentary and develop friendships with her subjects. When Bailey dies towards the end of the summer, Tibby refocuses her documentary to capture the memories that they created together.

Carmen goes to South Carolina to visit her father, from whom she has grown apart since his divorce from Carmen's mother several years ago. She is shocked to learn that he is newly engaged to a woman with two children her age. Feeling left out of her father's new family, she breaks a window in their home with a rock and returns home to her mother. She eventually reconciles with her father and his new family and attends his wedding at the end of the summer.

Bridget attends a soccer camp in Baja California. While there, she falls for one of the coaches, Eric Richman. Bridget pursues him in spite of the camp's prohibition on coaches and campers entering relationships with each other. She conspires to lose her virginity to him, until Eric eventually tells her that he does not feel as if he can worship her as she deserves. Lena comes to comfort a depressed Bridget and ends up taking her home.

== Production ==
Ann Brashares got the idea for the novel while working as an editor when colleague Jodi Anderson proposed the concept of a group of girlfriends who share a pair of jeans. This was based on some of Anderson's own college experiences. Brashares decided to write the book herself. Anderson was compensated with a small bonus and a promotion. Brashares later said, "I loved the idea. A shirt can more easily fit different people, but jeans are more judgmental. It totally captured my fancy."

== Themes ==
The Importance of Friendship

As the girls face challenges and different personal issues, they rely increasingly upon each other to cope with the changes. Their friendship helps them understand their identities more deeply.

The Search for Love

The novel describes love in various forms—self-love, friendship, family bonds, etc.—and proclaims that all forms of love must come naturally and be respected.

The Importance of Family

In the novel, the family is portrayed as being rooted in one's birth yet dynamic, and also as existing between friendships in addition to blood relatives.

Coming of Age

In the summer, the girls are expected to make decisions for themselves, behave as responsible adults, figure out how to overcome obstacles, and take risks.

== Critical reception ==
Sisterhood was well-reviewed at the time of its release. USA Today's Deidre Donahue said Sisterhood "has resonated far more deeply than any of the grown-up novels I've read this year." Linda Bindner of the School Library Journal called it "a complex book about a solid group of friends, with each one a strong and courageous individual in her own right." Publishers Weekly described it as "an outstanding and vivid book that will stay with readers for a long time."

Sisterhood became a New York Times bestseller, was named an ALA Best Books for Young Adults, won a Book Sense Book of the Year, and was named a Publishers Weekly Flying Start. The book received positive reviews from The Bulletin, and Seventeen, as well as starred reviews from Publishers Weekly, and Kirkus Reviews.

=== Awards ===
Awards for The Sisterhood of the Traveling Pants
Award	Year	Result	Ref
Lincoln Award	2007	Nominee	
Book Sense Book of the Year Award for Children's Literature	2004		
Oklahoma Sequoyah Award for YA	2004		
Missouri Gateway Readers Award	2004		
South Carolina Book Award for Young Adult Book Award	2004	Nominee	
Evergreen Teen Book Award	2004	Winner	
Eliot Rosewater Indiana High School Book Award	2004		
Iowa Teen Award	2004		
Pacific Northwest Library Association Young Reader's Choice Award for Senior	2004	Winner	
Deutscher Jugendliteraturpreis Nominee for Preis der Jugendjury	2003		
American Library Association Best Books for Young Adults	2002	Top Ten	
American Library Association Selected Audiobooks for Young Adults	2002		
Maryland Black-Eyed Susan Book Award for High School	2002-2003	Winner	
Rhode Island Teen Book Award	2002	Winner	
