= The Second Summer of the Sisterhood =

2003 novel by Ann Brashares

- Author: Ann Brashares
- Language: English
- Series: The Sisterhood of the Traveling Pants
- Genre: Young adult novel
- Publisher: Delacorte Press
- Publication date: April 2003
- Publication place: United States
- Media type: Print (hardback & paperback)
- Pages: 400 pp (first edition, hardback)
- ISBN: 978-0-385-72934-5 (first edition, hardback)
- OCLC: 52068318
- LC Class: PZ7.B73759 Se 2003
- Preceded by: The Sisterhood of the Traveling Pants
- Followed by: Girls in Pants

The Second Summer of the Sisterhood (also known as The Second Summer) is a novel written in 2003 by author Ann Brashares. The story continues the adventures of four best friends who own a magical pair of jeans that fit all of them, even though they are different sizes. During the summer, the girls share the pants. The book is the second installment in a series of five books: The Sisterhood of the Traveling Pants (2001), Girls in Pants (2004), Forever in Blue (2007), and Sisterhood Everlasting (2011).

The book was one of three adapted into a film The Sisterhood of the Traveling Pants 2 (2008).

== Plot summary ==
=== Lena ===
Following the events of the previous summer, Lena remains in touch with Kostos but breaks up with him after several months, feeling that she spends too much time missing him. When he comes to America in the summer for an internship, she realizes she is still in love with him and they reunite. However, Kostos suddenly returns to Greece several days later, leaving her behind with no explanation.

Shortly afterwards, Lena's grandfather suffers a stroke and passes away. At the funeral, Lena is doubly devastated to find that Kostos is now married. He reveals that after she broke up with him, he was depressed and slept with another woman, whom he got pregnant. He admits to Lena that he doesn't love his wife, but must be a "gentleman" and marry her; however, he makes it clear that he still loves Lena and always will.

Lena's mother consoles her with the story of her own first love, a similar long-distance relationship that ended shortly before she met Lena's father. At the end of the summer, Lena meets Carmen's stepbrother Paul, and Carmen notices a quiet chemistry between the two.

=== Tibby ===
At a summer film course in Virginia, Tibby befriends Alex and Maura, two classmates from New York. Although they act jaded and disdainful of their peers, Tibby finds Alex intriguing, talented and attractive. Hoping to impress him and feeling disregarded by her parents, she makes a hurtful movie about her mother for a class project.

Brian, who has become close with Tibby since Bailey's death, pays her a surprise visit, but she shuns him in favour of her new friends. When Tibby previews her movie at an open house weekend, her mother unexpectedly shows up and is upset at its contents. Brian is also disappointed by the movie and leaves when Tibby fails to defend him in front of Alex and Maura.

Tibby begins to reevaluate her actions, realizing that Alex and Maura's snideness is a shield for their phoniness and that Bailey would have disapproved of her. She ends her friendship with Alex and Maura, reconciles with her mother and Brian, and makes a heartfelt movie about Bailey instead for her final project.

=== Carmen ===
When Carmen's mother Christina begins a serious relationship with her coworker David, she begins to feel that Christina is moving ahead with her life and leaving her behind. Carmen's attempts to foster her own romance with her classmate Porter are also hindered by the distraction of her mother's new relationship.

Carmen's resentment eventually leads her to sabotage the relationship and cause her mother to break up with David. However, Christina's resulting depression leads Carmen to realize that her mother deserves happiness, even if she feels threatened by it, and she helps to reunite David and Christina.

Carmen also deals with an unexpected visit from her stepsister Krista, who runs away from Charleston to Bethesda after fighting with Carmen's stepmother. When Carmen calls Paul for advice, he suggests Krista is trying to be like her, leading Carmen to reflect on her own behaviour. They help Krista reconcile with Carmen's father and stepmother.

=== Bridget ===
After the events of last summer, Bridget has withdrawn into herself, becoming quiet and sedentary, and has quit soccer. When she discovers letters written to her and her brother by her estranged maternal grandmother, Greta Randolph, she travels to Alabama to visit Greta for the first time since her mother's death.

Under an alias, Bridget offers to help Greta around the house. She learns a great deal about her grandparents and her mother, and in doing so, starts to rediscover her old self, including her love of soccer. She begins coaching the local soccer team and rekindles a summer flirtation with Billy Kline, her childhood teammate and friend. Bridget eventually reveals her true identity to her grandmother, who confesses that she knew all along, and they form a strong bond.
