= Westfallen =

2024 novel by Ann Brashares and Ben Brashares

- Author: Ann Brashares and Ben Brashares
- Audio read by: Carlotta Brentan and André Santana
- Language: English
- Genre: Children's fiction; Alternate history; Science fiction; Thriller
- Publisher: Simon & Schuster Books for Young Readers (US); Bloomsbury Children’s Books (UK / international)
- Publication date: September 17, 2024
- Publication place: United States / United Kingdom
- Media type: Print
- Pages: 384
- ISBN: 9781665950817

Westfallen is a 2024 middle-grade alternate history/science-fiction thriller novel by Ann Brashares and Ben Brashares. The novel features children from the United States in 1944 and 2023 as they communicate via a ham radio. A turn of events results in an alternate history where the Nazis won World War II, which the children must work together to overturn.

The audiobook is narrated by Carlotta Brentan and André Santana.

A sequel, Westfallen: Into the Fire, was published in 2025.

== Plot ==
In 2023, three former friends reunite at the funeral of their shared pet gerbil. While burying the pet, they uncover a rusted radio buried in the garden. They move it to the tool shed; unexpectedly, the radio powers on and begins transmitting. At the same time, in 1944, another group of children discover the same radio in a shed in the same backyard, 79 years earlier. Through the radio, both groups realize they are communicating across decades.

Curiosity leads the kids to share information about the future: technology, sports, even the outcome of World War II. Initially, the 1944 children use these details to prevent a local catastrophe, feeling like heroes. However, their interference soon causes unintended consequences — the timeline shifts dramatically, and the world becomes unrecognizable. History changes: the war ends differently, with disastrous results. Now, the six children must work together across time to undo the damage and restore history.

The novel is narrated in alternating sections between Henry (the 2023 narrator) and Alice (the 1944 narrator).

== Publication ==
Westfallen was first published in the United States by Simon & Schuster Books for Young Readers. The novel was also published internationally by Bloomsbury Children’s Books.

Formats include hardcover, paperback, e-book, and audiobook.

== Themes and genre ==
The novel blends elements of alternate-history fiction and science fiction (time travel) with middle-grade adventure and thriller tropes. It asks “what if” questions about history, identity, responsibility, and the consequences of altering the past. The shifting viewpoints (present-day and 1944) underscore how small actions, especially when knowledge from the future enters the past, can ripple into dramatic changes.

== Reception ==
Westfallen is a Junior Library Guild selection. It was well received by critics, including starred reviews from Publishers Weekly and School Library Journal. Kirkus Reviews described the novel as "compulsively readable" and "morally uncomfortable".

It was a finalist for the 2024 Sidewise Awards for Alternate History in the Long Form category.

== See also ==
- Alternate history
- Time travel in fiction
- Children’s literature
