= 3 Willows: The Sisterhood Grows =

2009 novel by Ann Brashares

- Author: Ann Brashares
- Language: English
- Publisher: Delacorte Press
- Publication date: 13 January 2009
- Publication place: USA
- Media type: Print ()
- ISBN: 978-0-385-73676-3 (0-385-73676-2)

3 Willows: The Sisterhood Grows is a young adult novel by Ann Brashares published on January 13, 2009. It is a spin-off to The Sisterhood of the Traveling Pants series as main characters Polly, Jo and Ama are about to attend South Bethesda High School, the school the original sisterhood (Bridget "Bee" Vreeland, Lena Kaligaris, Carmen Lowell and Tibby Rollins) attended.

== Plot ==
3 Willows follows the characters of Polly, Ama, and Jo as they deal with issues in their personal lives as well as the stress of growing up. Polly is an outcast with dreams of having a more glamorous life and to become a model like the grandmother she never met. However issues with her mother could threaten to overshadow her hopes. Ama is a smart girl originally from Ghana. Though she is not particularly outdoorsy, her scholarship lands her in wilderness camp in Wyoming. Jo has become quite popular during her time away from Ama and Polly, winning the attention of both the popular kids as well as a cute guy named Zach. When his girlfriend comes back to town, Jo attempts to win Zach back only to end up losing her job. With her parents separating, can she find out what's most important in the end?

== Reception ==
Critical reception for 3 Willows: The Sisterhood Grows has been mixed to positive, with the School Library Journal praising the audio book's narration, while saying that the book as a whole "will find a place on the to-read list of many tweens and teens". Publishers Weekly wrote that "Brashares gets her characters’ emotions and interactions just right". Kirkus Reviews stated "At times the characters are difficult to distinguish from one another, and the parallels between the girls’ friendship and the willow trees they planted as children go over the top, but that will not detract from the book’s popularity". Booklist praised the book, saying that "Multiple copies are in order for any community where the Sisterhood series is popular."

== Connection to previous Sisterhood Characters ==
- One of the original characters, Bridget, is mentioned in 3 Willows. While she is coaching a soccer camp, and still dating her boyfriend, Eric Richman, some girls at the camp see them kiss.
- Effie, Lena's younger sister plays a significant role in the book.
- Tibby is mentioned by Polly, because she babysits for Nicky and Katherine, Tibby's younger siblings.
- Jo mentions having had to babysit Carmen's younger brother Ryan. Polly later babysits for Ryan as well.
- Lena is seen waiting for Effie outside of Surfside, the restaurant where Jo works.
- Brian, Tibby's boyfriend, visits Tibby's house, while Polly is babysitting. Nicky and Katherine love Brian, and he is supposedly "their favorite person in the world."
