= Alana Grace =

American actress and singer

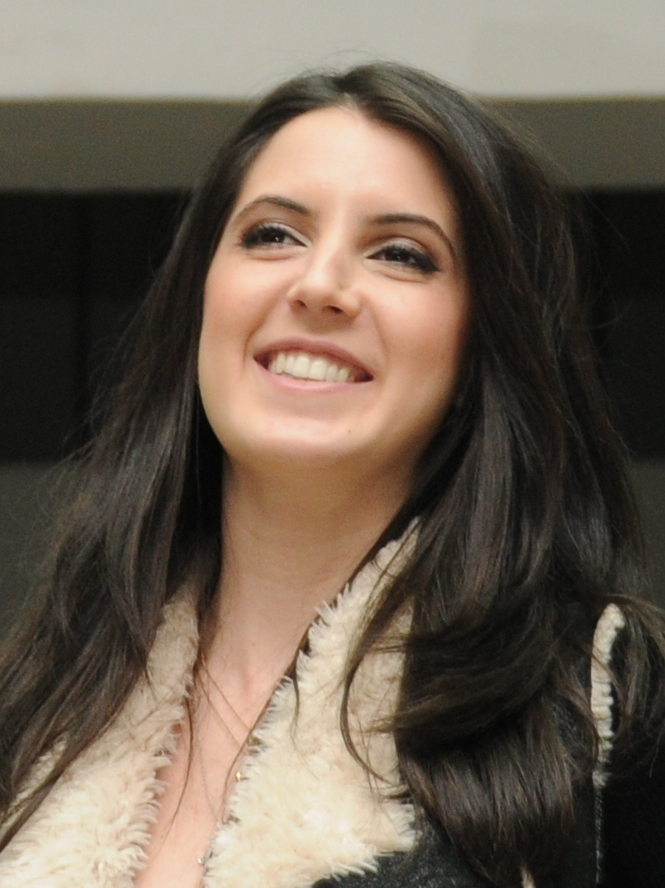
- Grace in 2010

Background information
- Born: Los Angeles, California, U.S.
- Origin: Nashville, Tennessee, U.S.
- Genres: Rock, alternative rock, progressive rock
- Occupations: Singer, songwriter, actress
- Label: Fragile Heart Records
- Website: alanagrace.com

Alana Grace is an American singer and actress who is best known for her song "Black Roses Red" on the soundtrack of Sisterhood of the Traveling Pants.

== Early life ==
Grace was born in Los Angeles, California, but moved with her family at the age of 6 to Nashville, Tennessee, where, she attended Harpeth Hall.

In 2002, at the age of 14, she was one of seven finalists chosen by music industry professionals at the second annual Nashville Grammy Showcase, hosted by the Nashville Chapter of the National Academy of Recording Arts and Sciences.

== Career ==
Grace is primarily a singer-songwriter, but has also studied dance and has acted in an NBC Movie of the Week and several TV specials, among them a TNN Entertainment Special. On June 1, 2005, she performed her song "Black Roses Red" on The Today Show on NBC. Grace studies vocal training with Brett Manning.

Grace's first album, Break The Silence, was released by Columbia Records. After the album didn't sell as well as she expected, she began to focus more on increasing her online audience. By 2008, Walmart had bought exclusive rights to sell her music.

Grace released her second album, With One Word, on Fragile Heart Records on April 10, 2009. She performed on the Vans Warped Tour to promote its release. In March 2010, a new Grace song, "7 Month Itch", from her third album, was premiered on her official website for streaming.

Grace is the lead vocalist of the band This Is She (formerly known as TOY). This Is She began with the Warped Tour 2009, when Grace's earlier solo project was playing on the same stages as After Midnight Project, which included Ryan Folden (drums) and Christian Paul Meadows (guitar). Grace needed a full band in 2011 and chose Folden and Meadows following the dissolution of After Midnight Project. This Is She embarked on a European tour with the Italian goth metal band Lacuna Coil in October and November 2012. Following the tour, This Is She broke up. From 2013, Grace began working as a DJ.

== Discography ==
=== Albums ===
- Break The Silence (February 27, 2007)
- With One Word (April 10, 2009)
- Nobody Is Ok (This Is She) (July 3, 2012)
