= Michael Rady =

American actor

- Born: August 20, 1981 (age 45); Philadelphia, Pennsylvania, U.S.
- Occupation: Actor
- Years active: 2005 – present
- Spouse: Rachael Kemery (m. 2010)
- Children: 4

Michael Rady is an American actor.

== Career ==
Rady made his acting debut in the feature film The Sisterhood of the Traveling Pants, playing Kostas Dounas, a role he reprised in the sequel, The Sisterhood of the Traveling Pants 2. He has appeared in other feature films with small parts including The Guardian. Rady also starred in the independent film InSearchOf.

Rady had a recurring role in the CBS summer series, Swingtown, playing philosophy teacher Doug Stephens. He appeared in the second season of Showtime's TV drama Sleeper Cell. Rady appeared as a guest star in two seasons of the ABC Family series Greek playing the Honors Polymer Science major and Honors Engineering Floor Resident Advisor Max Tyler. In 2009, he was cast in The CW series Melrose Place as Jonah Miller, an aspiring filmmaker. Since 2014, he has appeared in a number of made-for-television movies airing on the Hallmark Channel. Rady starred in The Mentalist as Special Agent in Charge Luther Wainwright for nine episodes in Season 4.

== Personal life ==
Rady is a vegan.

== Filmography ==
Film
Year	Title	Role	Notes
2005	The Sisterhood of the Traveling Pants	Kostas	
2006	Freedomland	(uncredited)	
2006	The Guardian	Nick Zingaro	
2008	The Sisterhood of the Traveling Pants 2	Kostas	
2009	InSearchOf	Jack Gross	
2009	Committed	Scott	Short film
2011	J. Edgar	Agent Jones	
2013	Blood Relative	Wade	

Television
Year	Title	Role	Notes
2006	Orpheus	Greg	TV movie
2006–2007	Sleeper Cell	Jason	4 episodes
2007	CSI: NY	Kevin Murray	Episode: "Time's Up"
2007	ER	Brian Moretti	2 episodes
2008	Swingtown	Doug Stephens	13 episodes
2008–2009	Greek	Max Tyler	14 episodes
2009	The Closer	Sam Linsky	Episode: "Fate Line"
2009	Grey's Anatomy	Mike Shelley	Episode: "I Will Follow You Into the Dark"
2009–2010	Melrose Place	Jonah Miller	18 episodes
2010	Medium	Liam McManus	Episode: "Time Keeps on Slipping"
2010	Castle	Evan Murphy	Episode: "A Deadly Affair"
2011	Happy Endings	John	Episode: "Bo Fight"
2011–2012	The Mentalist	Luther Wainwright	9 episodes
2012	House of Lies	Wes Spencer	4 episodes
2012	Random Encounters	Kevin	TV movie
2012–2013	Emily Owens M.D.	Micah Barnes	Main role
2014	Intelligence	Chris Jameson	Main role
2014	Cloudy With a Chance of Love	Quentin	Television film (Hallmark)
2014–2015	Jane the Virgin	Lachlan Moore	7 episodes
2015	Stalker	Dave Knox	Episode: "My Hero"
2015	It Had to be You	Derrick Henderson	Television film (PixL)
2016	Christmas in Homestead	Matt Larson	Television film (Hallmark)
2016	UnREAL	Coleman	Series regular in Season 2
2017	Lucifer	Mack Slater	Episode: "Chloe Does Lucifer"
2017	A Joyous Christmas	Jack	Television film (Hallmark Movies & Mysteries)
2017–2018	Atypical	Miles	3 episodes
2018	Timeless	Nicholas Keynes	Season 2 (8 episodes)
2018	Christmas at Pemberley Manor	William Darcy	Television film (Hallmark)
2019	Two Turtle Doves	Sam	Television film (Hallmark)
2019	Love to the Rescue	Eric Smith	Television film (Hallmark)
2020	You're Bacon Me Crazy	Gabe	Television film (Hallmark)
2020	The Christmas Bow	Patrick	Television film (Hallmark)
2021	A New Year's Resolution	Tom Malone	Television film (Hallmark)
2021	New Amsterdam	Dr. Hans Paré	Episode: "Things Fall Apart"
2021–2022	Chicago Med	Dr. Matt Cooper	Season 7 (11 episodes)
2022	The Good Fight	Carter Johnstone	Episode: "The End of Ginni"
2023	Unexpected Grace	Jack	Television film (Hallmark)
2023	Magnum P.I.	Detective Chris Childs	Recurring role, season 5
2023	Where Are You Christmas?	Hunter	Television film (Hallmark)
2024	Tracker	Elliot Rusch	Episode: "Noble Bot"
2025	Catch of the Day	Cam	Television film (Hallmark)
