= Alexis Bledel =

American actress and model (born 1981)

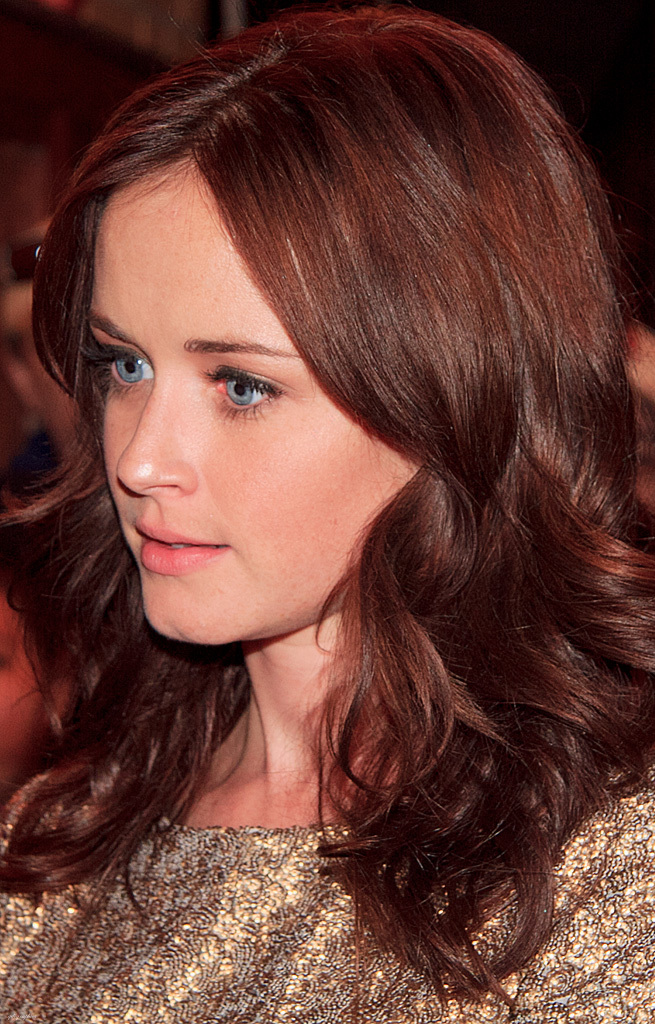
- Bledel in 2011
- Born: Kimberly Alexis Bledel; September 16, 1981 (age 45); Houston, Texas, U.S.
- Occupations: Actress; model
- Years active: 1996–present
- Works: Full list
- Spouse: Vincent Kartheiser (m. 2014; div. 2022)
- Children: 1
- Awards: Full list

Kimberly Alexis Bledel (/bləˈdɛl/ blə-DEL; born September 16, 1981) is an American actress and model. She is best known for her roles as Rory Gilmore on the television series Gilmore Girls and Emily Malek in The Handmaid's Tale. Bledel had a recurring role in Mad Men and reprised her role as Rory Gilmore in the 2016 Netflix revival Gilmore Girls: A Year in the Life.

Bledel made her feature film debut as Winnie Foster in the Disney live-action adaptation of Tuck Everlasting, and went on to appear in Sin City, Post Grad, and as Lena Kaligaris in The Sisterhood of the Traveling Pants and its sequel The Sisterhood of the Traveling Pants 2.

Bledel has received various awards and nominations for her work. For her role in Gilmore Girls, she received nominations for Satellite, Teen Choice, and Young Artist Awards. For her role in The Handmaid's Tale, she has received four Primetime Emmy Award nominations, winning Outstanding Guest Actress in a Drama Series. She has received three Screen Actors Guild Award nominations for Outstanding Ensemble Cast in a Drama Series.

== Early life and family ==
Bledel was born on September 16, 1981, in Houston, Texas, to Nanette (née Dozier), who worked as a gift processor and flight attendant, and Martín Bledel. She has a younger brother, Eric. Her father is from Argentina. Her mother was born in Phoenix, Arizona and moved with her family to Mexico when she was eight. Her paternal grandfather, Enrique Einar Bledel Huus, was born in Buenos Aires, Argentina, and was of Danish and German descent; Huus was Vice President of Coca-Cola Latin America and the Coca-Cola Inter-American Corporation. Bledel's paternal grandmother, Jean (née Campbell), was originally from New York and had Scottish, Irish, and English ancestry. Of her parents' upbringing in Latin America, Bledel said: "It's the only culture my mom knows from life, and my father as well, and they made the decision to raise their children within the context they had been raised in." Bledel grew up in a Spanish-speaking household, and did not learn English until she began school. She identifies as Latina.

Bledel attended Baptist and Lutheran schools, and graduated from the Catholic St. Agnes Academy in Houston in 1999. Her mother encouraged her to try community theater to overcome her shyness. As a child, Bledel appeared in local productions of Our Town and The Wonderful Wizard of Oz. She was scouted at a local shopping mall and given work as a fashion model. Bledel attended New York University before dropping out when she was cast in Gilmore Girls at the age of 18.

== Career ==
=== 2000–2008: Debut and rise to stardom ===
Bledel made her television debut in 2000 opposite Lauren Graham in The WB (now CW) comedy-drama Gilmore Girls, which ran for seven seasons from October 5, 2000, to May 15, 2007. She played Rory Gilmore, daughter of single mother Lorelai Gilmore (Graham). Bledel made her feature film in the fantasy romantic drama Tuck Everlasting (2002), based on Natalie Babbitt's 1975 novel of the same name. Before her work in that film, Bledel was an uncredited extra in the 1998 comedy-drama Rushmore. In 2005, she co-starred in the drama The Sisterhood of the Traveling Pants, opposite Amber Tamblyn, America Ferrera, and Blake Lively, based on Ann Brashares’ novel of the same name. She played Lena Kaligaris, an aspiring artist on a journey with her three best friends, linked over the summer by a pair of "magical" jeans.

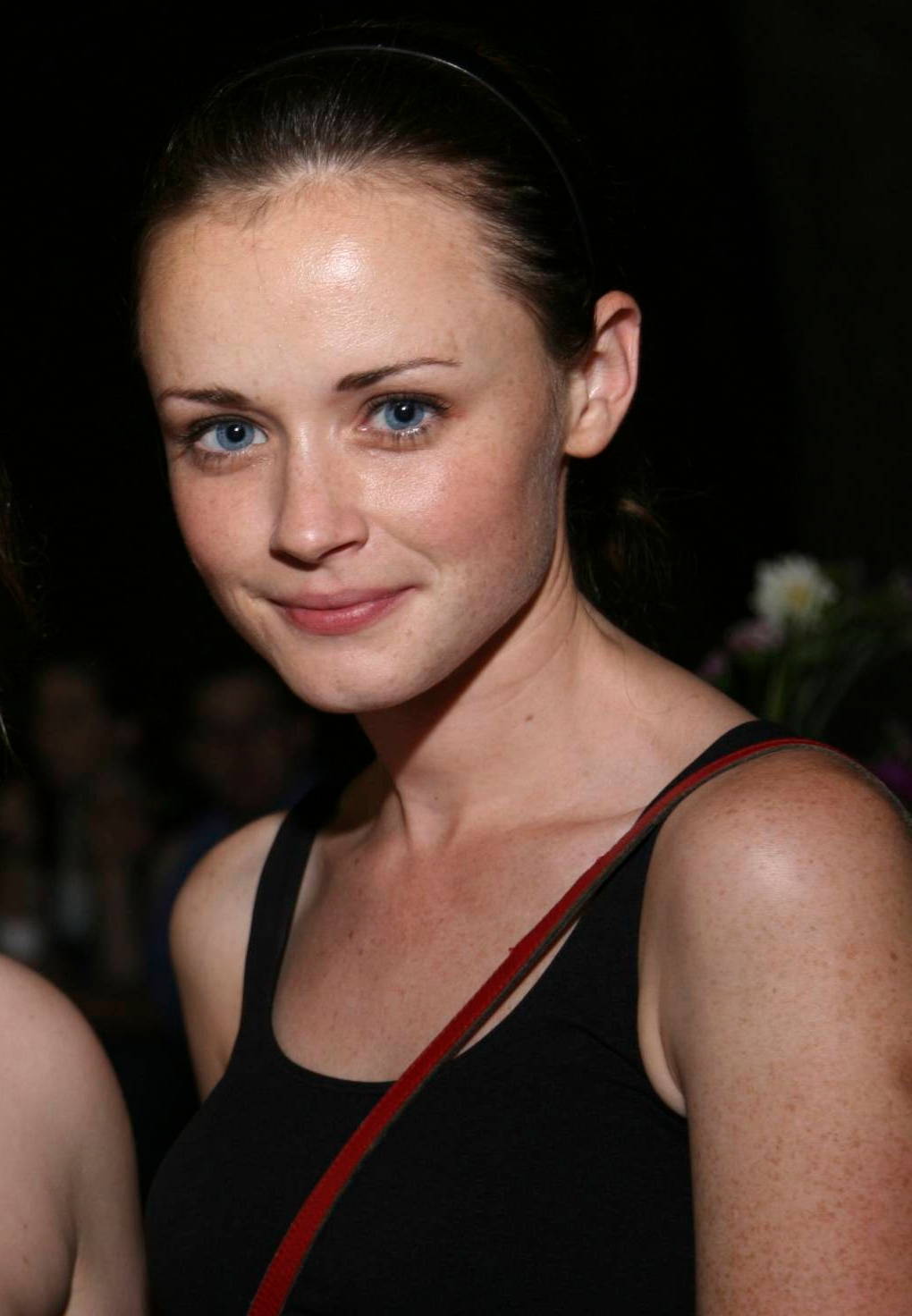
Bledel in June 2008

In 2005, Bledel co-starred in the anthology neo-noir crime thriller Sin City where she played Becky, a prostitute. "She's a very professional prostitute. She carries a gun and she kicks ass," said Bledel of her character. In 2006, Bledel co-starred opposite Jay Baruchel in the romantic comedy I'm Reed Fish as the fiancée of Baruchel's title character. After the end of Gilmore Girls, she reprised her role of Lena Kaligaris in The Sisterhood of the Traveling Pants 2, released in August 2008. The following year, Bledel starred in the comedy Post Grad, which was released on August 21, 2009.

=== 2009–present: Continued recognition ===
Bledel co-starred in the romantic comedy The Good Guy, which premiered at Tribeca Film Festival April 26, 2009. In April 2009, Bledel guest-starred in the NBC medical drama ER in the two-hour series finale "And in the End..." as Dr. Julia Wise, a new intern to the hospital. In May 2009, Bledel signed a contract with the modeling division of IMG.

Bledel co-starred in the historical drama The Conspirator, directed by Robert Redford. The film premiered at the Toronto International Film Festival and was released in the United States on April 15, 2011. Also in 2010, Bledel starred as the title role in the Canadian drama The Kate Logan Affair. The film was presented at Montreal's Festival du Nouveau Cinéma in 2010.

Bledel performed in the theatre production Regrets by the Manhattan Theatre Club, staged at the New York City Center. It was confirmed in March 2013 that Bledel would co-star opposite Jason Ritter in the Fox pilot Friends & Family, an adaptation of the British sitcom Gavin & Stacey as Stacey with Ritter as Gavin. The pilot was picked up for a series and was retitled Us & Them. Fox decided not to air the series, which eventually aired in the fall of 2018 on Sony Crackle. In 2015 Bledel starred in the film Jenny's Wedding.

On January 29, 2016, Netflix announced a revival of Gilmore Girls with a series of four 90-minute films set around the four seasons, and Bledel's participation was confirmed. In 2017, she appeared as Ofglen, later known as Emily Malek in The Handmaid's Tale for Hulu; subsequently, her role was expanded to a regular role for the second season. Her acclaimed performance earned Bledel her first Emmy Award nomination and win in the 2017 Creative Arts ceremony in the category of Outstanding Guest Actress in a Drama Series. She departed after the fourth season and made a special guest appearance in the show's series finale.

== Public image ==
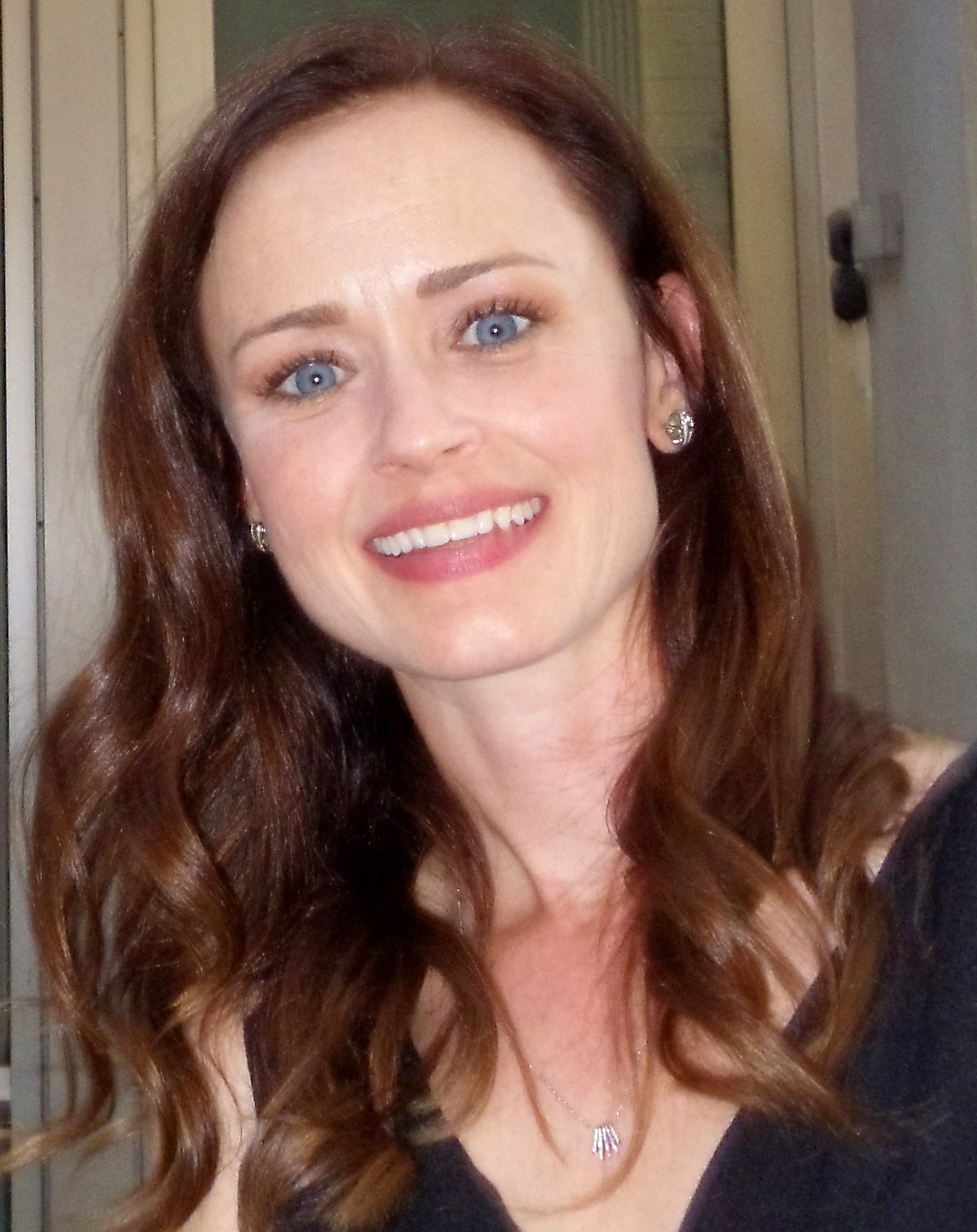
Bledel in 2017

In 2000, she appeared in print advertisements for Bonne Bell lip balm and Naturistics lip gloss.

She has been included in magazine lists of the world's most beautiful women. In 2002, she was named one of Teen People's "25 Hottest Stars under 25". Bledel was ranked at number 87 on Maxim magazine's "Hot 100 of 2005" list. Bledel was named one of Us Weekly's "25 Most Stylish New Yorkers" in 2010.

== Personal life ==
Bledel and Gilmore Girls co-star Milo Ventimiglia were in a relationship from December 2002 to June 2006.

In 2012, Bledel began dating Vincent Kartheiser. They met during her guest-starring run on Mad Men. They announced their engagement in March 2013 and married in California in June 2014. Bledel gave birth to their son in the fall of 2015. On August 10, 2022, Kartheiser filed for divorce from Bledel; the divorce was finalized on August 30.

Bledel supported the 2012 re-election of Barack Obama and urged her fans to vote.

== Filmography ==
=== Film ===
Year	Title	Role	Notes
1998	Rushmore	Student	Uncredited
2002	Tuck Everlasting	Winifred Foster	
2004	DysEnchanted	Goldilocks	Short film
2004	Bride and Prejudice	Georgina Darcy	
2005	Sin City	Becky	
2005	The Sisterhood of the Traveling Pants	Lena Kaligaris	
2006	I'm Reed Fish	Kate Peterson	
2006	Zoom	Ace	Uncredited
2006	Life Is Short	Charlotte	Short film
2008	The Sisterhood of the Traveling Pants 2	Lena Kaligaris	
2009	The Good Guy	Beth Vest	
2009	Post Grad	Ryden Malby	
2009	The Ballad of G.I. Joe	Lady Jaye	Video short
2010	The Conspirator	Sarah Weston	
2010	The Kate Logan Affair	Kate Logan	
2010	Girl Walks into a Bar	Kim	
2011	Violet & Daisy	Violet	
2012	The Brass Teapot	Payton	
2014	Parts per Billion	Sarah	
2014	Outliving Emily	Emily Hanratty	Segment 2: "Discord"
2015	Jenny's Wedding	Kitty Friedman	
2019	Crypto	Katie	
2026	Ponderosa	Sandra	
TBA	Joy Will Prevail	Harriet Pattison	

=== Television ===
Year	Title	Role	Notes
2000–2007	Gilmore Girls	Rory Gilmore	Main role
2009	ER	Dr. Julia Wise	Episode: "And in the End..."
2012	Mad Men	Beth Dawes	3 episodes
2013	Remember Sunday	Molly Branford	Television film: Hallmark Hall of Fame
2014	Us & Them	Stacey	Main role (Note: This series was originally ordered by Fox for broadcast in the 2013–14 season, but was not aired due to creative differences (though it aired in international markets). The series eventually aired its seven produced episodes in the United States in October 2018 through Sony Crackle.)
2015	Motive	Robin Gould	Episode: "Oblivion"
2016	Gilmore Girls: A Year in the Life	Rory Gilmore	Main role
2017–2021; 2025	The Handmaid's Tale	Emily Malek	Main role (seasons 1-4); Guest (season 6)

=== Theater ===
Year	Title	Role	Date	Notes
2011	Love, Loss, and What I Wore	N/A	January 12 – February 13, 2011	
2012	Regrets	Chrissie Myers	March 27 – April 29, 2012	
2016	College Republicans	Lee Atwater	April 23, 2016	Staged reading of screenplay

=== Music videos ===
- "She's Gonna Break Soon" (2003) by Less Than Jake
