= Ann Brashares =

American children's writer

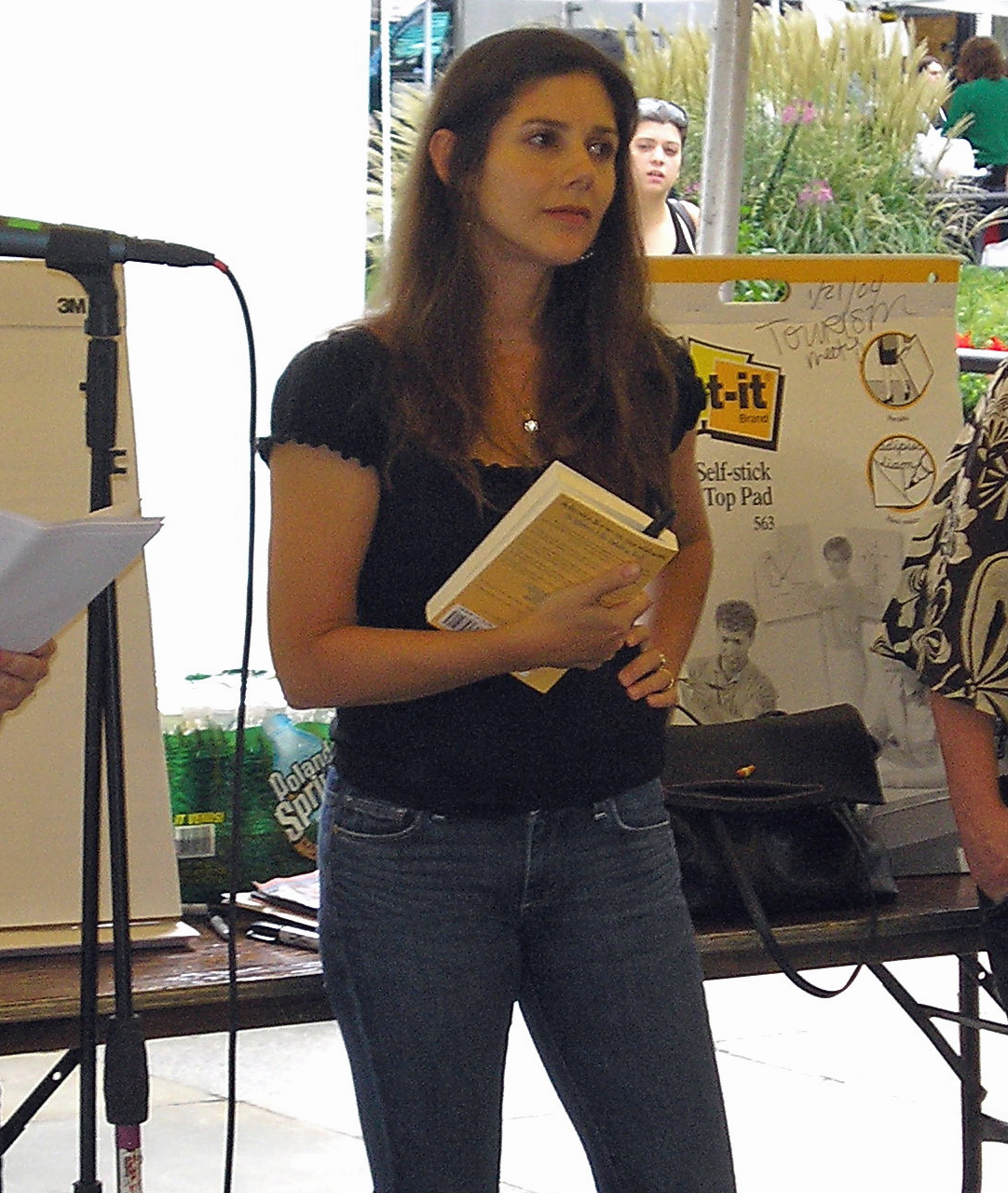
- Brashares in 2006
- Born: March 19, 1967 (age 59); Alexandria, Virginia, U.S.
- Education: Barnard College
- Occupation: Young adult fiction novelist
- Notable work: The Sisterhood of the Traveling Pants
- Children: 4

Ann Brashares (born March 6, 1967) is an American young adult novelist. She is best known as the author of The Sisterhood of the Traveling Pants series.

== Early life ==
Brashares was born on 19 March 1967 in Alexandria, Virginia. She grew up in Chevy Chase, Maryland with her three brothers. She attended elementary and high school at the Sidwell Friends School in Washington, D.C. She studied philosophy at Barnard College.

== Career ==
After graduation, Brasheres worked as an editor for 17th Street Productions. 17th Street was acquired by Alloy Entertainment, and following the acquisition she worked briefly for Alloy. After leaving Alloy, she wrote The Sisterhood of the Traveling Pants (2001), which became an international best seller. It was followed with three more titles in the "Pants" series that were The Second Summer of the Sisterhood (2003), Girls in Pants: The Third Summer of the Sisterhood (2005) and Forever in Blue: The Fourth Summer of the Sisterhood (2007). The first book in the series was adapted into the film The Sisterhood of the Traveling Pants in 2005. The sequel, The Sisterhood of the Traveling Pants 2, based on the other three novels in the series was released in August 2008. Brashares' first novel for adults, The Last Summer (of You and Me) was released in 2007. The first companion book to the Sisterhood series, 3 Willows: The Sisterhood Grows, was published in 2009, and the second companion book, Sisterhood Everlasting, was published in 2011. Her second novel for adults, My Name is Memory was published in 2010 and has been optioned for film. Brashares' young-adult time travel novel, The Here and Now, was published in April 2014. She resides in New York City with her artist husband, Jacob Collins, and children Samuel, Nathaniel, Susannah and Isaiah.

== Works ==
Brashares mainly writes for young adults. Besides the Sisterhood series and its two companion books, 3 Willows and Sisterhood Everlasting, she has contributed two 80-page biographies to the nonfiction book series Techies and has published two standalone novels for adults. She won the Indies Choice Book Award for Children's Literature in 2002, and won the Quill Award for Young teen/adult in 2005.

=== Nonfiction ===
- 2001 – Linus Torvalds, Software Rebel (Twenty-First Century Books, 2001)
- 2001 – Steve Jobs Thinks Different (Twenty-First Century, 2001)

=== Fiction ===
- 2001 – The Sisterhood of the Traveling Pants
- 2003 – The Second Summer of the Sisterhood
- 2005 – Girls in Pants: The Third Summer of the Sisterhood
- 2007 – Forever in Blue: The Fourth Summer of the Sisterhood
- 2007 – The Last Summer (of You and Me)
- 2009 – 3 Willows: The Sisterhood Grows
- 2010 – My Name Is Memory
- 2011 – Sisterhood Everlasting
- 2014 – The Here and Now (Delacorte, April 2014)
- 2017 – The Summer Bed (previously published as The Whole Thing Together)
- 2024 – Westfallen (co-written with her brother and children's author Ben Brashares)
