= Forever in Blue: The Fourth Summer of the Sisterhood =

2007 novel by Ann Brashares

- Author: Ann Brashares
- Language: English
- Series: The Sisterhood of the Travelling Pants
- Genre: Young adult novel
- Publisher: Delacorte Press
- Publication date: January 9, 2007
- Publication place: United States
- Media type: Print (hardback & paperback)
- Preceded by: Girls in Pants
- Followed by: Sisterhood Everlasting

Forever in Blue: The Fourth Summer of the Sisterhood (also known as Forever in Blue) is the fourth novel in Ann Brashares's acclaimed "Sisterhood" series. The story concludes the adventures of four girls who share a pair of "magical" pants that fit each one of them perfectly, despite their vastly different shapes and sizes. This is the fourth book in The Sisterhood of the Traveling Pants series and was considered the last until Brashares published a fifth book in 2011. It was released on January 9, 2007.

The Sisterhood of the Traveling Pants 2, a movie based on the book, was released on August 6, 2008.

== Plot summary ==
=== Lena ===
While taking a summer painting class at RISD, Lena becomes friends with Leo, a classmate with a reputation as one of the school's most talented artists. Leo invites Lena over to his house for dinner, where she meets his mother, a professional artist who suggests that Lena and Leo pose for each other's figure paintings. Although this leaves Lena flustered, she agrees. She and Leo develop a mutual attraction and kiss after their first session.

Shortly afterwards, Kostos appears at Lena's dorm and informs her that he divorced his wife after she lied to him about being pregnant with their child. Lena is initially shocked by his sudden appearance and becomes angry at him for expecting her to wait for him after he abandoned her. However, when she goes to apologize the next day, Kostos has already left. Lena poses for Leo again and has sex with him this time, but realizes that she never had feelings for him the way she had for Kostos, and they break up amicably.

When Lena goes to Greece at the end of the summer, she encounters Kostos, who admits that he had gone to the U.S. planning to propose to her and never thought she might say no. Lena apologizes for her actions at her dorm and cries in his arms, and the two of them agree that they may never fall in love with anyone else. With Kostos returning to university in London the next day, they kiss and part ways, but not before Kostos tells Lena one word in Greek - "someday".

=== Tibby ===
Tibby is staying at NYU over the summer to work and take a script-writing class. Early in the summer, Brian visits her with the news that he has successfully transferred to NYU and will join her in the fall. That evening, they get drunk and have sex for the first time. However, Tibby has a pregnancy scare, which causes her to withdraw into herself and have doubts about her relationship with Brian. These persist even after she realizes she is not pregnant, so she breaks up with him.

Tibby begins to second-guess her actions when Brian tells her that he will no longer be transferring to NYU after their breakup. She becomes even more upset when Effie, Lena's younger sister, seeks her permission to begin dating Brian. Tibby eventually realizes that she allowed her fears over the pregnancy scare to cloud her feelings for Brian. She apologizes to him, and they resume their relationship.

=== Bridget ===
Having finished her first year at Brown, Bridget is upset to learn that Eric has taken a job as a coach at a summer camp in Mexico. Not wanting to spend the summer at home, she impulsively signs up for an archaeological dig in Turkey.

Bridget enjoys the work and finds herself attracted to Peter, a handsome young professor on the dig. They kiss on his thirtieth birthday, but when Peter's wife and kids visit the next day, Bridget realizes that she almost ruined what she longs for most: a family. Upon returning home, she attempts to get closer to her father and brother. When Eric visits, her family, while clearly uncomfortable in social situations, tries to get to know him for Bridget's sake. Later that evening, Eric tells Bridget how much he missed her, and she realizes that she missed him as well.

The next morning, Bridget finds some of her father's boxes in the basement filled with carefully organized and preserved mementos of her mother, her brother, and her younger self. Bridget realizes that her father truly cares about her, and that despite their limitations, her family does have something to offer her.

=== Carmen ===
Carmen, after a year of social transparency at Williams and a self-proclaimed loss of identity, has maintained only one new friendship: Julia, the resident "drama diva" and one of the few freshmen widely known in the social standings. Julia is glamorous, sophisticated, exuberant, and popular - the antithesis of the "new Carmen". She invites Carmen to work on the sets of the school play and later convinces Carmen to attend a summer theater program in Vermont with her.

Although Carmen joins the program only expecting to build sets, she is talked into auditioning and lands a coveted role as Perdita in a professional production of The Winter's Tale, while Julia only gets a small role in the community play. She grows jealous of Carmen, who begins to make new friends and regain her self-confidence. When Julia's happiness only returns after Carmen begins to struggle with her acting, Carmen realizes that Julia enjoys her feelings of unworthiness, as they make her feel better by comparison. At the end of the summer, Carmen performs successfully in the play, having rediscovered her identity, and ends her friendship with Julia.

=== Summer's End ===
After Brian breaks up with Effie, she runs off to spend a week in Oia with her grandmother. Effie impulsively takes the Traveling Pants with her in order to get back at Tibby (for getting back together with Brian) and Lena (for always choosing her friends over her sister), but accidentally loses them.

The girls travel to Greece to try to find the Pants, but are unsuccessful despite days of searching. However, they realize that they had begun to rely on the Pants to maintain their connection, rather than trying to maintain it themselves. They vow to always maintain their bond, but not to allow it to keep them from moving forward.

== Reception ==
Kirkus Reviews called Forever in Blue "An ode to love and friendship to delight Brashares’s legions of fans, who have spent a good deal of their young lives sharing the Pants along with the sisterhood." while Publishers Weekly found that "Brashares credibly recounts the emotional turmoil surrounding the girls' love, peer and family tribulations." and concludes "The series' legion followers will eagerly follow each gal through her summer of ups and downs and will again be heartened by the teens' rock-solid friendship" Common Sense Media stated "While the series' start was a good fit for older tweens, this is really better for a more mature reader, who will better understand what the characters are feeling." Jenny McWha of Girls Can Do Anything magazine was positive, writing "The characters feel like friends: you want to cry when they cry and smile whenever they smile. Ann Brashares’ writing is clever and interesting, making it hard to put down."
