= The Sisterhood of the Traveling Pants 2 =

2008 film directed by Sanaa Hamri

- Theatrical release poster
- Directed by: Sanaa Hamri
- Screenplay by: Elizabeth Chandler
- Based on: The Sisterhood of the Traveling Pants by Ann Brashares
- Produced by: Debra Martin Chase; Denise Di Novi; Broderick Johnson; Kira Davis
- Starring: Amber Tamblyn; America Ferrera; Blake Lively; Alexis Bledel; Rachel Nichols; Rachel Ticotin; Shohreh Aghdashloo; Blythe Danner
- Cinematography: Jim Denault
- Edited by: Melissa Kent
- Music by: Rachel Portman
- Production companies: Alcon Entertainment; Alloy Entertainment; Di Novi Pictures; Martin Chase Productions
- Distributed by: Warner Bros. Pictures
- Release date: August 6, 2008
- Running time: 120 minutes
- Country: United States
- Language: English
- Budget: $27 million
- Box office: $44.3 million

The Sisterhood of the Traveling Pants 2 is a 2008 American comedy-drama film directed by Sanaa Hamri and written by Elizabeth Chandler. A sequel to the 2005 film The Sisterhood of the Traveling Pants, it is based upon the fourth novel in the book series: Forever in Blue (2007), but incorporates scenes and storylines from The Second Summer of the Sisterhood (2003) and Girls in Pants (2004). The film stars Amber Tamblyn, America Ferrera, Blake Lively, and Alexis Bledel as four childhood friends who navigate early adulthood during the summer after their freshman year in college.

The film was theatrically released by Warner Bros. Pictures in the United States on August 6, 2008, and grossed $44.3 million worldwide against a $27 million budget. The film received mixed reviews from critics. Since 2018, a third film has been in development.

== Plot ==
Childhood friends Bridget Vreeland, Lena Kaligaris, Tibby Rollins, and Carmen Lowell have completed their first year of college and will spend their summers apart.

Bridget finds letters from her grandmother Greta her father had hidden, but does not accept it was to protect her. She goes to Turkey for an archaeological dig but after reading her grandmother's letters, Bridget leaves to visit her in Alabama. She learns her mother, who committed suicide, had denied having depression or any mental issues.

Not allowing anyone into her life who challenged this or got her help, Bridget's father tolerated it but Greta could not, so she moved away as her daughter refused help. Greta assures Bridget that her suicide was not her father's fault, observing she is 'stronger' than her. Bridget later returns home and reconciles with her father.

While mourning her grandfather Bapi's death in Greece, Lena meets her ex-boyfriend Kostas. He reveals he is married and expecting a baby with his wife. She returns to the RISD and begins dating her life class model, Leo.

Kostas visits her, revealing that his marriage was annulled after his wife admitted she was not actually pregnant. Lena forgives him but refuses to take him back, saying they have changed. However, after spending time with Leo, she realizes they are incompatible.

Tibby works at a video store in NYC while retaking a screenwriting class at NYU that requires her to finish her script. While losing her virginity to her boyfriend Brian, the condom breaks. Fearing she might be pregnant, Tibby withdraws emotionally. She breaks up with Brian and reluctantly gives Lena's younger sister Effie permission to date him.

Lena brings Tibby a requested pregnancy test, but she gets her period before needing it. Tibby drives to Vermont, hoping for Carmen's support, but leaves after they argue over who ignores whom more. She goes to Brian's and apologizes, confessing she had been afraid of dealing with change. Realizing he still loves Tibby, he breaks up with Effie.

Carmen attends an actor workshop in Vermont, prompted by fellow Yale student Julia. During auditions for The Winter's Tale, Ian, an actor, encourages Carmen to try out. She ultimately wins the lead, Perdita, causing Julia to become envious. Carmen grows more confident when her talent is seen by the director Bill and the other actors, including Ian, with whom she begins a flirtatious friendship.

One night, Julia says she has a date with Ian, upsetting Carmen and causing her to falter in rehearsals. When her mother Christina goes into labor early, she reconciles with Tibby and asks her to help. Ian comforts Carmen, revealing he only had dinner with Julia because she begged.

Carmen overhears Julia trying to undermine her to Bill, who refuses to replace her. Regaining her confidence, she performs successfully, and kisses Ian after the play. While packing to leave, she chastises Julia.

Effie, upset with Brian and Lena, steals the pants and loses them in Greece while visiting their grandmother. The four friends disagree on whether the pants are worth saving, so Lena travels to Greece alone to look for them. Discovering from Effie that Lena refused to take Kostas back when he visited her in Rhode Island, the other three follow her to help search for the pants and convince Lena to give Kostas another chance.

Lena sees Kostas, who reveals he will be doing a master's degree at the London School of Economics, but they part. Later, Lena looks for Kostas on his boat and they kiss. Although they do not find the pants, the summer ends in Greece with the four friends renewing their mutual commitment to each other.

== Cast ==
- Amber Tamblyn as Tibby Rollins
- America Ferrera as Carmen Lowell
- Blake Lively as Bridget Vreeland
- Alexis Bledel as Lena Kaligaris
- Rachel Nichols as Julia Beckwith
- Tom Wisdom as Ian
- Rachel Ticotin as Christina
- Leonardo Nam as Brian McBrian
- Michael Rady as Kostas Dounas
- Jesse Williams as Leo
- Shohreh Aghdashloo as Prof. Nasrin Mehani
- Blythe Danner as Greta Randolph, Bridget's maternal grandmother
- Lucy Kate Hale as Effie Kaligaris, Lena's younger sister
- Maria Konstandarou as Yia Yia, Lena's maternal grandmother
- Ernie Lively as Franz Vreeland, Bridget's father
- Carly Rose Sonenclar as Katherine Rollins
- Kyle MacLachlan as Bill Kerr (uncredited)

== Production ==
Principal photography started on June 3, 2007. The filming began on the island of Santorini, Greece in Oia and continued in Connecticut. Western Connecticut State University was used for the scenes of Lena at the Rhode Island School of Design campus. Tibby's scenes were filmed in New York City.

== Soundtrack and score ==
The Sisterhood of the Traveling Pants 2

Soundtrack album by Various
- Released: August 6, 2008
- Label: Warner Bros. Records

1. Rock & Roll – Eric Hutchinson
2. Together – Michelle Branch
3. Sunset Man – James Otto
4. No One's Aware – Jack Savoretti
5. Warm Whispers – Missy Higgins
6. Friday Night – Craig David
7. Sister Rosetta (Capture the Spirit) – Noisettes
8. 5 Times Out of 100 – Hot Hot Heat
9. Girls Just Want To Have Fun – Cyndi Lauper
10. You Are Mine – Mutemath
11. Strange & Beautiful – Aqualung

In addition, Varèse Sarabande released an album of the film's score, composed by Rachel Portman (unlike the film's stars, composer Cliff Eidelman did not return for the sequel).

1. Sisterhood (3:29)
2. Kostas (:44)
3. Carmen And Ian Rehearse (2:39)
4. Welcome Home (1:07)
5. Bridget (3:20)
6. The Letters (2:43)
7. Lena (4:14)
8. Tibby (4:07)
9. Carmen (3:52)
10. Well Worn Pair Of Pants (1:39)

== Reception ==
On Rotten Tomatoes, the film has a 66% approval rating based on 97 reviews with an average rating of 6/10. The site's critical consensus reads "The workable chemistry among the four leads combined with the enriching message make for a winning Sisterhood of the Traveling Pants 2". Similarly, Metacritic gave the film a 63/100 score based on 26 reviews, indicating "generally favorable reviews". Audiences polled by CinemaScore gave the film an average grade of "A-" on an A+ to F scale.

On its opening weekend, the film performed better than its predecessor, opening #4 at the box office with $10,678,430. As of November 7, 2008, the film had grossed $44,080,484 domestically.

== DVD release ==
The DVD and Blu-ray were released in the United States on November 18, 2008. In Australia, the film was released straight-to-DVD.

== Awards ==
- 2009 – Nominated; Teen Choice Award for Choice Movie: Romance

== Sequel ==
A film based on the book sequel to The Sisterhood of the Traveling Pants 2 had been announced and it was produced by Alloy Entertainment. Chase expressed in a 2024 interview that she "would love" to make another sequel with Ferrera, Lively, Tamblyn, and Bledel, "I'm doing sequels to some of my other classic movies right now. I think, you know, time has gone by and the audiences still very much want it. So maybe."
