= Sisterhood Everlasting =

2011 novel by Ann Brashares

- Author: Ann Brashares
- Language: English
- Series: The Sisterhood of the Travelling Pants
- Genre: Young adult novel
- Publisher: Delacorte Press
- Publication date: June 14, 2011
- Publication place: United States
- Media type: Print (hardback & paperback)
- Pages: 384
- ISBN: 978-0385521239
- Preceded by: Forever in Blue

Sisterhood Everlasting is the fifth and last novel in Ann Brashares's "Sisterhood" series. The story concludes the adventures of four girls who share a pair of "magical" pants that fit each one of them perfectly, despite their vastly different shapes and sizes. This is the fifth book in The Sisterhood of the Traveling Pants series.

== Plot summary ==
=== Tibby Rollins ===
Ten years following the events of Forever in Blue, Tibby has moved to Australia with Brian and has almost no contact with Lena, Bridget, and Carmen. She calls them together for one last trip to Greece, but unexpectedly dies in a swimming accident before they arrive. This devastates her friends, who believe that she has killed herself and begin to question everything that they believe in.

It is eventually revealed that after moving to Australia two years ago, Tibby gave birth to a daughter, Bailey. Around that time, she was also diagnosed with Huntington's disease and was aware that she was going to die soon, even though her death was an accident. When she invited the girls to Greece, she intended to share her diagnosis and give them post-dated letters to help them move on, encouraging them to follow their hearts because life is too short to waste.

Tibby's letters to her friends invite them to an address in rural Pennsylvania the following spring, which is revealed to be a farm that she had bought for her family and loved ones. At the farm, Lena, Bridget, and Carmen conduct one last Traveling Pants ritual in Tibby's honour.

=== Lena Kaligaris ===
Lena is now an art teacher at the Rhode Island School of Design, casually dating a sandwich maker named Drew, and still obsessing over Kostos, who is now a successful businessman in London. After Tibby's death, she stays behind in Greece to handle administrative matters and reaches out to Kostos for help. They rekindle their friendship and remain in touch through handwritten letters, which turn into a deeply intimate correspondence. Lena eventually realizes that she is not afraid of her feelings for Kostos, and they get back together.

=== Bridget Vreeland ===
Bridget now lives in San Francisco with Eric, and although she wants to settle down with him, a part of her is restless. After Tibby's death, Bridget leaves Eric, and soon after finds out she is pregnant with his child. She visits Brian in Australia to try to piece together what happened to Tibby, where she meets Bailey. Bridget and Bailey form a very close bond, and although Bridget initially intends to terminate her pregnancy, she decides not to after spending time with Bailey. She accompanies Brian and Bailey back to the United States, where she reunites with Eric, and they move into the icehouse on Tibby's farm.

=== Carmen Lowell ===
Carmen is now a semi-successful, work-obsessed actress in New York and is engaged to Jones, an occasionally pretentious television executive whom her friends dislike. On a train trip to an audition in New Orleans, she befriends a Chilean immigrant named Roberto Moyo and his two young children. Hearing Roberto's sad life story compels Carmen to reflect on her own life and re-evaluate her priorities. She breaks off her engagement and moves into a cottage on Tibby's farm, becoming more satisfied with her life.
