= The Sisterhood of the Traveling Pants (film) =

2005 American film directed by Ken Kwapis

- Theatrical release poster
- Directed by: Ken Kwapis
- Screenplay by: Delia Ephron; Elizabeth Chandler
- Based on: The Sisterhood of the Traveling Pants by Ann Brashares
- Produced by: Debra Martin Chase; Denise Di Novi; Andrew Kosove; Broderick Johnson
- Starring: Amber Tamblyn; America Ferrera; Blake Lively; Alexis Bledel; Bradley Whitford; Nancy Travis; Rachel Ticotin; Jenna Boyd
- Cinematography: John Bailey
- Edited by: Kathryn Himoff
- Music by: Cliff Eidelman
- Production companies: Alcon Entertainment; Di Novi Pictures; Debra Martin Chase Productions; Alloy Entertainment
- Distributed by: Warner Bros. Pictures
- Release date: June 1, 2005 (United States)
- Running time: 119 minutes
- Country: United States
- Language: English
- Budget: $25 million
- Box office: $42 million

The Sisterhood of the Traveling Pants is a 2005 American coming-of-age comedy-drama film directed by Ken Kwapis from a screenplay by Delia Ephron and Elizabeth Chandler, based on the 2001 novel of the same name by Ann Brashares. It stars America Ferrera, Amber Tamblyn, Blake Lively, and Alexis Bledel. It follows four best friends who buy a mysterious pair of pants that fits each of them despite their differing sizes. They share the pants equally as they spend their first summer apart.

It was released in the United States on June 3, 2005, by Warner Bros. Pictures. A sequel, The Sisterhood of the Traveling Pants 2, was released on August 6, 2008.

In 2018, a third film had been in development, as was a musical adaptation based on the first film.

== Plot ==
Lifelong best friends Lena Kaligaris, Tabitha "Tibby" Rollins, Carmen Lowell, and Bridget Vreeland are teens from Bethesda, Maryland who are about to spend their first summer apart – Lena is visiting her grandparents in Santorini, Bridget is attending soccer camp in Baja California, Carmen is visiting her father in South Carolina, and Tibby is staying home. While shopping together, the four find a pair of jeans that fit them all perfectly despite their very different figures. They decide to share them equally over the summer, before parting the next day.

While wearing the pants, Lena is saved from drowning by local Greek boy Kostas Dounas. She later discovers her family has been feuding with Kostas' for ages due to a fiscal dispute between their respective grandfathers. Kostas pursues Lena, insisting the feud has nothing to do with them.

Lena initially rebuffs Kosta's advances, but eventually begins to secretly date him. Just after Kostas tells her he loves her, her family drags her away before she can answer. Lena's grandmother berates her for seeing him, but Lena appeals to her grandfather, who allows her to see Kostas before he leaves for Athens.

Working at a department store, Tibby finds a young girl unconscious and calls 911. Later, the same girl delivers the pants to Tibby's home when they are erroneously delivered to hers. Fascinated by Tibby's film-making, she introduces herself to Tibby as Bailey and appoints herself Tibby's assistant, to Tibby's initial annoyance.

Tibby later learns that Bailey has leukemia. She visits her in the hospital with the pants, pleading with her to take them and let their magic cure her, but Bailey declines as she believes their magic brought them together. She later dies. Devastated, Tibby then edits her film inspired by and called "Bailey".

Arriving in South Carolina, Carmen finds that her white father Al is about to marry Lydia, a single WASP mother to teens Paul and Krista. Although Al's step-family initially seems welcoming, they soon begin to emotionally exclude Carmen, whose Catholic Puerto Ricann upbringing creates a cultural disconnect.

They dismiss Carmen when she speaks Spanish to Al, assuming he still understands her from his marriage to her mother. They then reject her when she suggests making Puerto Rican recipes for dinner. Carmen overhears Krista and her friend talk mockingly about her.

Carmen soon begins to resent Al for being an enthusiastic and present father to Krista and Paul while he has been largely absent from her life. She is humiliated at a dress fitting when her bridesmaid dress is too tight and the saleswoman refers to her as "the other one". So, Carmen lashes out at everyone before fleeing.

Carmen returns to the house, sees Al and her step-family happily enjoying dinner together, unconcerned with her absence. Enraged, she throws a rock through their dining room window and returns to Maryland. Tibby tries to help Carmen reconcile her feelings toward her father, but she lashes out at her. Tibby leaves upset, but they eventually reconcile.

Tibby convinces Carmen to confront her father via phone. So, she is able to express her feelings of neglect and abandonment. He apologizes sincerely, but Carmen says it is not enough.

At soccer camp, Bridget develops a crush on coach Eric Richman. Despite relationships between coaches and campers being forbidden, she flirts with him and seeks his attention during games, eventually losing her virginity to him on the beach at night. Bridget becomes depressed after their encounter and isolates herself upon returning home.

Carmen and Tibby visit Bridget, whereupon she confides she is afraid of turning out like her mother, whose depression led to her suicide. The two reassure her that she is stronger than her mother and comfort her with happy memories. On his way back to Columbia University, Eric apologizes to Bridget and expresses hope that she will reconsider him when she is older.

The girls meet Lena at the airport before driving to South Carolina to attend Al's wedding, despite Carmen's reluctance. Al publicly apologizes for neglecting her, and Carmen accepts his apology, joining the blended family onstage for the ceremony.

== Cast ==
- Amber Tamblyn as Tabitha "Tibby" Tomko-Rollins
  - Victoria Tennant as Young Tibby
- America Ferrera as Carmen Lowell
  - Tiara Santana as Young Carmen
- Blake Lively as Bridget Vreeland
  - Ashley Hale as Young Bridget
- Alexis Bledel as Lena Kaligaris
  - Alanna Dawn Ekkert as Young Lena
- Bradley Whitford as Albert "Al" Lowell, Carmen's father
- Nancy Travis as Lydia Rodman, Carmen's stepmother
- Rachel Ticotin as Christina
- Jenna Boyd as Bailey Graffman
- Mike Vogel as Eric Richman
- Michael Rady as Kostas Dounas
- Leonardo Nam as Brian McBrian
- Maria Konstandarou as Yia Yia, Lena's maternal grandmother
- George Touliatos as Papou, Lena's maternal grandfather
- Kyle Schmid as Paul Rodman, Carmen's stepbrother
- Erica Hubbard as Soccer Pal Diana
- Kristie Marsden as Soccer Pal Olivia
- Emily Tennant as Krista Rodman, Carmen's stepsister
- Ernie Lively as Franz Vreeland

== Production ==
=== Casting ===
A number of young actresses were in talks to be cast for the movie. Hilary Duff was reportedly considered for the role of Tibby; the director chose Tamblyn instead.

Producer Debra Martin Chase, also behind the Cheetah Girls and Princess Diaries films, said Ferrera was "the first one we cast". Other actresses originally included Mischa Barton, Kristin Kreuk, and Olivia Wilde.

=== Filming ===
Principal photography started on May 17, 2004. Filming began on the island of Santorini, Greece. Filming then continued in Cabo San Lucas, Mexico.

The film was partially shot in British Columbia at Kamloops and Ashcroft, along with the Zellers store at Coquitlam Centre in Coquitlam.

== Reception and legacy ==
=== Critical response ===
On Rotten Tomatoes, the film has an approval rating of 82% based on 151 reviews, with an average rating of 6.7/10. The site's critical consensus reads "With surprisingly touching earnestness, The Sisterhood of The Traveling Pants follows four best friends as they try on adulthood — and though it isn't an easy fit, their journey becomes bearable thanks to the threads they share". Metacritic gives the film a weighted average score of 66 out of 100 based on 34 reviews, indicating "generally favorable reviews". Audiences polled by CinemaScore gave the film an average grade of "A-" on an A+ to F scale.

Shondaland mentioned in its review of the film that Bridget's white underwear (seen in the trial scene at the beginning of the film) was iconic.

=== Box office ===
On its opening weekend, the film opened #5 at the box office with $9,833,340. As of November 14, 2008, the film had grossed $42,013,878 worldwide.

== Home media ==
The DVD was released in the US on October 11, 2005, and it included extras including deleted scenes and conversations with cast members.

== Soundtrack and score ==
The song album was released by Columbia Records on May 24, 2005.

1. "These Days" – Chantal Kreviazuk (3:57)
2. "Unwritten" – Natasha Bedingfield (4:19)
3. "Time of Our Lives" – Paul van Dyk (3:37)
4. "Black Roses Red" – Alana Grace (4:12)
5. "If God Made You" (Radio Remix) – Five for Fighting (4:16)
6. "Just for You" – William Tell (3:46)
7. "Closer to You" – Brandi Carlile (2:54)
8. "No Sleep Tonight" – The Faders (3:00)
9. "I Want You to Know" – Chantal Kreviazuk (3:19)
10. "Be Be Your Love" – Rachael Yamagata (4:14)
11. "Sun's Gonna Rise" – Shannon Curfman (3:55)
12. "Simple" – Katy Perry (3:39)
13. "Always There in You" – Valli Girls (an early track involving members of HAIM)(3:46)

The album of Cliff Eidelman's score was released by Varèse Sarabande on July 12, 2005.

1. "Prologue" (3:44)
2. "Deja Blue" (1:04)
3. "Fate" (1:01)
4. "Rules of the Pants" (3:26)
5. "A Touch of Greece" (1:18)
6. "Honey" (1:10)
7. "The Traveling Pants" (:53)
8. "Reflection" (2:07)
9. "Running" (1:26)
10. "Traveling to Baja" (:39)
11. "The Way of the Pants" (:34)
12. "Letter" (1:48)
13. "Broken Heart" (1:16)
14. "A Brave Soul" (1:15)
15. "Last Words" (:58)
16. "Us" (2:18)
17. "Sisterhood Reunites" (1:14)
18. "Together" (1:29)
19. "The Traveling Song" (3:17)
20. "Piano Suite" (4:03)

== Awards ==
Award	Category	Recipient	Result	Ref.
ALMA Awards	Outstanding Actress in a Motion Picture	America Ferrera	Nominated	
Imagen Awards	Best Actress	America Ferrera	Won	
Satellite Awards	Best Actress in a Supporting Role - Comedy or Musical	America Ferrera	Nominated	
Satellite Awards	Best Youth DVD	Widescreen edition	Nominated	
Teen Choice Awards	Choice Movie - Drama	—	Nominated	
Teen Choice Awards	Choice Movie Actress - Drama	Alexis Bledel	Nominated	
Teen Choice Awards	Choice Movie Actress - Drama	Amber Tamblyn	Nominated	
Teen Choice Awards	Choice Love Scene	Alexis Bledel tells Michael Rady she loves him	Nominated	
Teen Choice Awards	Choice Hissy Fit	America Ferrera	Nominated	
Teen Choice Awards	Choice Breakout Performance - Male	Michael Rady	Nominated	
Teen Choice Awards	Choice Breakout Performance - Female	America Ferrara	Nominated	
Teen Choice Awards	Choice Breakout Performance - Female	Blake Lively	Nominated	
Teen Choice Awards	Choice Breakout Performance - Female	Jenna Boyd	Nominated	
Young Artist Awards	Best Performance in a Feature Film - Supporting Young Actress	Jenna Boyd	Nominated	
Young Artist Awards	Best Family Feature Film - Drama	—	Nominated	
