= The Sisterhood of the Traveling Pants =

Young adult novel series by Ann Brashares

- Author: Ann Brashares
- Genre: Young adult fiction
- Publisher: Turtleback Books

The Sisterhood of the Traveling Pants is a series of five bestselling young adult novels by Ann Brashares: The Sisterhood of the Traveling Pants (2001), The Second Summer of the Sisterhood (2003), Girls in Pants (2005), Forever in Blue (2007), and Sisterhood Everlasting (2011). There is a novel called 3 Willows: The Sisterhood Grows (2009), which explores similar themes and in which the main characters of the other five novels appear as minor characters.

Released by Random House, the novels tell the continuing story of four young girls who acquire a pair of jeans that fit all four of them perfectly, even though they are all different shapes and sizes. The four main characters are Lena Kaligaris, Tabitha "Tibby" Rollins, Bridget "Bee" Vreeland, and Carmen Lowell. Carmen delivers the prologue and epilogue in first person in the first and fifth books and tends to play the role of keeping the group of friends together throughout the series.

The series begins in Bethesda, Maryland with the four girls beginning the summer prior to their junior year in high school, and then follows them through four consecutive summers, finally ending with the summer break following their freshman year of college. During this time the girls develop in various ways, but their ultimate goal is to learn to become individuals whilst maintaining their childhood friendship that makes them whole. A spin-off novel was released in 2011 and picks up about ten years later, as the girls are about to turn 30.

Parts of the series have been translated into many languages, including French, Italian, and Finnish.

== Adaptations ==
Two films have been developed based on the novels: The Sisterhood of the Traveling Pants (2005) starring Alexis Bledel as Lena, Amber Tamblyn as Tibby, America Ferrera as Carmen, and Blake Lively as Bridget. A second film; The Sisterhood of the Traveling Pants 2 was released in 2008.

A third film was announced in 2014 that would be based on the book Sisterhood Everlasting, and produced by Alloy Entertainment. Liz W. Garcia was tapped to write a screenplay and Ken Kwapis, director of the first film, would be directing this installment. Alexis Bledel confirmed that the film had recently been pitched. Amber Tamblyn stated in October 2022 that family life was one of the elements in preventing the film getting made. Producer Debra Martin Chase expressed in a 2024 interview that she "would love" to make a third film.

As of 2018, it was reported that a musical adaptation based on the 2005 film is in development.
