= Robia Rashid =

American TV producer and writer

- Born: Robia Sara Rashid; July 30, 1977 (age 49)
- Occupations: TV writer-producer TV showrunner
- Years active: 2005–present
- Known for: Atypical
- Spouse: Michael Oppenhuizen
- Children: 2

Robia Sara Rashid (born July 30, 1977) is an American television writer-producer and showrunner. She is widely known as the creator of Netflix original series Atypical. Rashid was also the co-story editor, co-producer and supervising producer of the CBS sitcom series How I Met Your Mother.

== Early life and education ==
Rashid said that she grew up in a biracial family in northern Vermont. She is half-Pakistani, half-European. Her father is from Pakistan and her mother's family's origins are from England and Ireland. She said her family was very influenced by the counterculture of the 1960s, and were, as she describes them, hippies.

Rashid has an undergraduate degree in education. In 2005, Rashid graduated from New York University Tisch School of the Arts with an master's of fine arts degree in the dramatic writing program.

== Career ==
Rashid got her start working in the non-profit sector at the Posse Foundation in a college scholarship and mentorship program for inner city kids in Boston.

Rashid was a playwright in New York City before starting to work in network television.

Rashid's writing professor at NYU, Cindy Chupack, shared a spec script with her agent, which led to a writing job on the final season of Will & Grace, which she got immediately after graduating from NYU.

She wrote on The Loop and then for Aliens in America.

From 2008 to 2012, Rashid worked on the TV show How I Met Your Mother, where she started out as a writer and eventually became a supervising producer. From 2014 to 2015, Rashid also co-executive produced and wrote one episode of the TV series, The Goldbergs.

Rashid is the creator of the Peabody Award nominated TV show Atypical, a Netflix comedy that premiered in 2017 about a young man on the autism spectrum who begins dating. The show stars Keir Gilchrist, Jack Haven, Michael Rapaport, and Jennifer Jason Leigh.

== Personal life ==
Rashid is married to Michael Oppenhuizen. They have two children. She lives in Los Angeles.

== Honors and awards ==
- 2017: WGA West, Media Access Awards, Evan Somers Memorial Award
- 2018: Peabody Award (nominee) for Atypical
- 2018: Satellite Awards (nominee) for Atypical
- 2018: AutFest 2018, Spotlight Award for Atypical
- 2019: The Miracle Project, Entertainment Angel Award

== Filmography ==
- 2005: University Place TV movie – writer
- 2006: Will & Grace TV series – written by (1 episode)
- 2007: The Loop TV series - writer (2 episodes), staff writer (1 episode)
- 2007-2008: Aliens in America TV series – written by (2 episodes)
- 2008-2012: How I Met Your Mother TV series – supervising producer (24 episodes), co-producer (24 episodes), executive story editor (24 episodes), story editor (24 episodes), written by (5 episodes)
- 2011: The Trainee TV series – associate producer (3 episodes)
- 2012: Friend Me TV series – co-executive producer (8 episodes), written by (1 episode: "Amanda Is Now Friends with Chuck")
- 2013: Camp TV series – consulting producer (1 episode), written by (1 episode: "The Wedding")
- 2014: Bad Teacher TV series – consulting producer (12 episodes)
- 2014-2015: The Goldbergs TV series – co-executive producer (24 episodes), written by (1 episode: "I Rode a Hoverboard!")
- 2017-2021: Atypical TV series – creator (28 episodes), executive producer (18 episodes), written by (9 episodes), director (1 episode)
