= Cynthia Gibb =

American actress and model (born 1963)

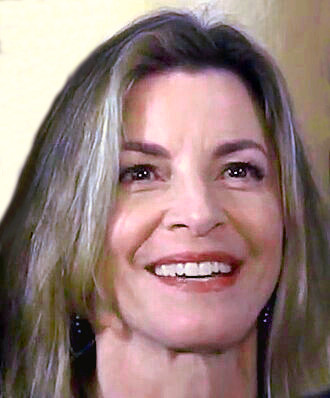
- Gibb at SBIFF 2023
- Born: Cynthia Lowrie Gibb; December 14, 1963 (age 62); Bennington, Vermont, U.S.
- Education: Staples High School
- Occupations: Actress; model
- Years active: 1980–present
- Known for: Fame; Gypsy; Youngblood; Short Circuit 2 Holiday Affair; The Karen Carpenter Story; Mary Christmas
- Spouse: Scott Kramer (divorced)
- Children: 3
- Website: cynthiagibb.me

Cynthia Lowrie Gibb (born December 14, 1963), also credited as Cindy Gibb, is an American actress and former model who has starred in film and on television. She began her career as a cast member on the musical television drama Fame, based on the movie of the same name. She also appeared in the films Youngblood (1986), Salvador (1986), Malone (1987), Short Circuit 2 (1988) and Death Warrant (1990). She received a Golden Globe nomination for her performance as Gypsy Rose Lee in the film Gypsy (1993).

== Early life ==
Cynthia Lowrie Gibb was born December 14, 1963, in Bennington, Vermont. She grew up in Westport, Connecticut and attended Staples High School.

== Career ==
At the age of 14, she began assignments with the Ford Modeling Agency in New York City. She was on the cover of Vogue and Young Miss magazines. It was during this period that she was cast for her first film role in 1980, as a Young Fan in the Woody Allen film Stardust Memories.

In 1986, Gibb had her first female lead role as Jessie Chadwick in the sports drama Youngblood, also starring Rob Lowe and Patrick Swayze. Later that year, she portrayed an American lay missionary in El Salvador who was brutally raped and murdered in the drama Salvador, directed by Oliver Stone and starring James Woods.

On television, Gibb also played the role of Susan Martin Wyatt Carter on the soap opera Search for Tomorrow, appearing from 1981 to 1983. Gibb was also a regular for three of the six seasons of the television series Fame, which aired from 1982 to 1987. Gibb later starred in the NBC sitcom Madman of the People (1994–1995), and the UPN series Deadly Games (1995–1997). Over her career, Gibb has appeared in many various TV series, including 7th Heaven, Judging Amy, Law & Order: Special Victims Unit, Without A Trace, and Criminal Minds.

Gibb has also appeared in many TV movies, most notably in the lead role of Karen Carpenter in The Karen Carpenter Story which aired on CBS on January 1, 1989 and was the highest-rated TV movie of that year, and in the 1993 TV adaptation of Gypsy, for which she was nominated for a Golden Globe Award for Best Supporting Actress – Series, Miniseries or Television Film; where Gibb played the adult Gypsy Rose Lee opposite Bette Midler as Madame Rose. She played Dr. Amanda Bentley in a trio of Diagnosis: Murder TV movies between 1992 and 1993. In 2002, she played Mary Maloney opposite John Schneider in Mary Christmas.

== Filmography ==
=== Film ===
Year	Title	Role
1980	Stardust Memories	Young Girl Fan
1986	Youngblood	Jessie Chadwick
1986	Salvador	Cathy Moore
1986	Modern Girls	Cece
1987	Malone	Jo Barlow
1988	Jack's Back	Chris Moscari
1988	Short Circuit 2	Sandy Banatoni
1990	Death Warrant	Amanda Beckett
1997	Volcano: Fire on the Mountain	Kelly Adams
2002	Full Frontal	Pregnant Woman
2008	Beautiful Loser	Bonnie (adult)
2008	Fall of Hyperion	Jenni Hansen
2010	A Nanny for Christmas	Samantha Ryland
2010	The Funeral Planner	Cynthia Gibb
2013	Before I Sleep	Caroline
2016	Caged No More	Lottie
2016	Hunter's Cove	Sandy
2023	Karen Carpenter: Starving for Perfection	Herself
2026	Once More: The Karen Carpenter Story Reunion	Herself

=== Television ===
Year	Title	Role	Notes
1981–1983	Search for Tomorrow	Suzi Wyatt	172 episodes TV series
1983–1987	Fame	Holly Laird	57 episodes Nominated – Young Artist Award for Best Young Actress in a Drama Series (1984)
1989	The Karen Carpenter Story	Karen Carpenter	TV movie
1989	When We Were Young	Ellen Reese	TV movie
1990	Midnight Caller	Willi	Episode: "Three for the Money"
1990	Tales from the Crypt	Lorelei Phelps	Episode: "Korman's Kalamity"
1992	Diagnosis: Murder	Dr. Amanda Bentley	TV movie
1992	Drive Like Lightning	Ginger McDaniel	TV movie
1992	The House on Sycamore Street	Dr. Amanda Bentley	TV movie
1993	A Twist of the Knife	Dr. Amanda Bentley	TV movie
1993	The Woman Who Loved Elvis	Emily	TV movie
1993	Gypsy	Louise / Gypsy Rose Lee	TV movie Nominated – Golden Globe Award for Best Supporting Actress – Series, Miniseries or Television Film
1994	51st Golden Globe Awards	Herself - Nominee	TV movie
1994	Sin & Redemption	Billie Simms	TV movie
1994	Fatal Vows: The Alexandra O'Hara Story	Alexandra O'Hara	TV movie
1994–1995	Madman of the People	Meg Buckner	16 episodes
1995–1997	Deadly Games	Lauren Ashborne / The Girl	13 episodes
1996	Holiday Affair	Jodie Ennis	TV movie
1997	Volcano: Fire on the Mountain	Kelly Adams	TV movie
1997	Love-Struck	Emily Vale	TV movie
1997	High Stakes	Annie	TV movie
1997	Superman: The Animated Series	Trish Mills (voice)	Episode: "Prototype"
1998	Earthquake in New York	Laura Rykker	TV movie
2000	This Is How the World Ends	Nicole Van Dyke	TV movie
2001	The Wandering Soul Murders	Jill Dempsey	TV movie
2001	A Colder Kind of Death	Jill Dempsey	TV movie
2001	Life with Judy Garland: Me and My Shadows	Narrator (voice)	TV movie
2001	Judging Amy	Irene Kroft	Episode: "The Unforgiven"
2002	The Division	Donna Packard	Episode: "Hide and Seek"
2002	Mary Christmas	Mary Maloney	TV movie
2003	Mary Higgins Clark: A Crime of Passion	Frederica Dumay	TV movie
2004	Law & Order: Special Victims Unit	Karen Campbell	Episode: "Poison"
2005	Missing	Dr. Susan Reynolds	Episode: "Patient X"
2006	7th Heaven	Betsey	Episode: "You Don't Know What You've Got 'Til He's Gone"
2007	Demons from Her Past	Marilyn Baxter	TV movie
2007	A Family Lost	Valerie Williamson	TV movie
2007	Christie's Revenge	Miranda Colton	TV movie
2007	An Accidental Christmas	Vicky	TV movie
2008	Without a Trace	Tracie Duncan	Episode: "True/False"
2009	Criminal Minds	Kathy Gray	Episode: "Bloodline"
2010	Accused at 17	Jacqui Miller	TV movie
2011	Cinnamon	Professor Madeline Walters	TV movie (aka "My Dog's Christmas Miracle")
2013	The Cheating Pact	Brenda Marshall	TV movie
2015	Christmas Land	Elaine Nickerson	TV movie
2016	Broadcasting Christmas	Patrice Montgomery	TV movie
2017	Stalker's Prey	Sandy Wilcox	TV movie (aka "Hunter's Cove)
2017	Sharing Christmas	Helen	TV movie
2020	Ivy & Mistletoe	Mary Anderson	TV movie
2020	Christmas on the Menu	Shannon Byrde	TV movie

== Soundtrack ==
Year	Production	Notes
1983-1985	Fame	performer: "Hey Look Me Over", "One Dream", "If the Lady Wants to Play", "The Loser Gets to Win", "Lucky Star", "Geometry", "Shopping From A to Z", "Friends", "Let the Sunshine In", "Take Me to Your Heart", "Starting at the End", "We're All the Same", It's in Everyone of Us", "Rudy's Restaurant and Cabaret", "Out Here on My Own", "Rock 'n Roll World", "Watcha Gonna Do", "Drive Me Wild" (uncredited), "Little Red Corvette", "Heart Attack", "We Got Tonight", "Never Gonna Let You Go" (uncredited), "Childhood's End", "On the West Side", "I Can't Stand Up Alone", "Drive Me Wild", "By My Side" (uncredited)
1989	The Karen Carpenter Story	Genre: Biography Drama performer: "The End of the World"
1993	Gypsy	TV Movie performer: "Little Lamb", "Dainty June and Her Farmboys", "If Momma Was Married", "Together", "Wherever We Go", "Let Me Entertain You"
1998	Earthquake in New York	TV Movie performer:"Jose Can You See?" (uncredited)

== Awards and nominations ==
Year	Awards	Category	Nominated work	Result	Ref.
1984	Young Artist Awards	Best Young Actress in a Drama Series	Fame	Nominated	
1994	51st Golden Globe Awards	Golden Globe Award for Best Supporting Actress – Series, Miniseries or Television Film	Gypsy	Nominated	
2023	Ridgefield Independent Film Festival	Best Narrative Short	Lux Freer	Won	
2023	Indie Short Fest	Honorable Mention	Lux Freer	Won	
2023	New York Cinematography Awards	Best USA Film	Lux Freer	Won	
2023	New York Cinematography Awards	Best First-Time Director	Lux Freer	Won	
