= The Gathering (miniseries) =

2007 American television miniseries

- Genre: Mystery thriller
- Written by: John Shiban
- Directed by: Bill Eagles
- Starring: Peter Gallagher; Jamie-Lynn Sigler; Peter Fonda
- Music by: Jeff Rona
- Country of origin: United States
- Original language: English

Production
- Executive producers: David Eick; John Shiban; Tom Patricia
- Producer: John M. Eckert
- Production location: Toronto
- Cinematography: Steve Cosens
- Editors: Paul Trejo; Lynne M. Whitlock
- Running time: 172 minutes (2 parts)
- Production companies: Cine Pico Film & Television; Patriarch Pictures; Sony Pictures Television

Original release
- Network: Lifetime
- Release: October 13 – October 14, 2007

The Gathering is an American mystery thriller television miniseries directed by Bill Eagles, written by John Shiban, and starring Peter Gallagher, Jamie-Lynn Sigler, and Peter Fonda. It aired in two parts, from October 13–14, 2007, on Lifetime Television.

== Plot ==
Dr. Michael Foster wakes up one night to find his wife, Ann, missing. He is left with these mysteries and confusing clues, including disturbing images of his daughter and Ann. In the attempt to put those clues together, he discovers his wife's involvement with an ancient group of witches in modern-day New York City. As Michael gets closer to finding his wife and uncovering the truth, he realizes that very powerful people are involved in the mystery. Now Michael must not trust anyone and hurry before they get to him first.

== Cast ==
- Peter Fonda as Thomas Carrier
- Peter Gallagher as Dr. Michael Forster
- Jamie-Lynn Sigler as Maggy Rue
- Jenna Boyd as Elizabeth Foster
- Hannah Lochner as Sarah
- Kristin Lehman as Ann Foster

== Production ==
Filming took place in Toronto from May 28 to July 23, 2007.
