= Betty G. Birney =

American writer (b. 1947)

- Born: April 26, 1947 (age 79); St. Louis, Missouri
- Education: Webster University
- Occupation: Author
- Children: 3
- Writing career
- Years active: 1992–present
- Genre: Children's fiction
- Notable work: Humphrey
- Website: bettybirney.com

Betty G. Birney (born April 26, 1947) is an American author, screenwriter, and teacher. She is best known for the Humphrey children's book series.

== Personal life ==
Betty G. Birney was born in St. Louis, Missouri. She grew up and went to school in Affton, a suburb of St. Louis, and went to college at Webster College, now Webster University in Webster Groves. She spent much of her life as an English teacher. Today Birney lives in New York, New York.

== Career ==
Birney wrote her first book, "Teddy Bear in the Woods" when she was only seven years old. As a professional writer she has written several books for Disney and has also worked at Disneyland. She has also written for video games, television, and movies, including the 2002 made-for-TV film Mary Christmas.

== Bibliography ==
=== Humphrey series ===
The Humphrey series, also known as According to Humphrey, follows the daily adventures of Humphrey, a hamster who is the class pet at an elementary school. Every week the teacher, Mrs. Brisbane, lets someone take Humphrey home. Humphrey, who was introduced to the class by a substitute teacher, Ms. McNamara (known as "Ms. Mac" to the students), is smarter than he looks and often helps the children with their problems, though no one expects anything from him because he's a hamster. He can leave his cage whenever he wants because the lock doesn't lock, and nobody knows about this except for him. Every kid in Humphrey's class has a different nickname, such as Lower-Your-Voice A.J. or Speak-Up Sayeh. Humphrey also bonds with Aldo, a janitor who comes in to clean the room after school, and even helps Aldo to get a girlfriend. Humphrey and Mrs. Brisbane feel negatively about each other at first, but warm up to each other later. Humphrey is later reluctantly brought home by Mrs Brisbane for Thanksgiving (due to none of the class being able to take him home), where he meets her husband, who also takes a dislike to him at first, before later warming to him. In book 2 another class pet, a frog named Og, is introduced. In Summer According to Humphrey, Humphrey is brought to summer school. Starting in School Days According to Humphrey, a new school year begins, and with it there is a new group of kids.

The first title in the series, The World According to Humphrey, was published on February 2, 2004. PW praised The World According to Humphrey, calling it a "breezy, well-crafted first novel, narrated by a hamster." The series has two spinoffs: Humphrey's Tiny Tales and Og the Frog. Birney announced on her website that a new Humphrey book will be released in 2024.

- The World According to Humphrey (2004)
- Friendship According to Humphrey (2005)
- Trouble According to Humphrey (2007)
- Surprises According to Humphrey (2008)
- Adventure According to Humphrey (2008)
- Summer According to Humphrey (2009)
- School Days According to Humphrey (2011)
- Mysteries According to Humphrey (2012)
- Winter According to Humphrey (2012)
- Secrets According to Humphrey (2014)
- Imagination According to Humphrey (2015)
- Spring According to Humphrey (2016)
- Happiness According to Humphrey (2024)

==== Other Humphrey Books ====
- More Adventures According to Humphrey (2009)
- Humphrey's Big-Big-Big Book of Stories (2009)
- Holidays According to Humphrey (2010)
- Humphreys Book of Fun-Fun-Fun (2010)
- Humphrey's Great-Great-Great Book of Stories (2010)
- Humphrey's Ha-Ha-Ha Joke Book (2011)
- Humphrey's World of Pets (2011)
- Christmas According to Humphrey (2012)
- Humphrey's Book of Summer Fun (2013)
- Humphrey's Book of Christmas Fun (2013)
- Humphrey's Ho-Ho-Ho Book of Stories (2013)
- Humphrey's Mixed-Up Magic Trick (2016)

==== Humphrey's Tiny Tales ====
- My Pet Show Panic! (aka Humphrey's Pet Show Panic) (2011)
- My Summer Fair Surprise! (2011)
- My Creepy-Crawly Camping Adventure (2011)
- My Great Big Birthday Bash! (2012)
- My Treasure Hunt Trouble! (2012)
- My Playful Puppy Problem! (2013)
- Really Wheely Racing Day (2013)
- My Mixed Up Magic Trick! (2016)
- Bumper Book of Humphrey's Tiny Tales (2014)
- Bumper Book of Humphrey's Tiny Tales 2 (2014)

==== Og the Frog ====
- Life According to Og the Frog (2018)
- Exploring According to Og the Frog (2019)
- Wildlife According to Og the Frog (2020)

=== Picture books ===
- What's My Job (1992)
- Disney's the Little Mermaid (1992)
- Bambi's Snowy Day (1992)
- Disney's Beauty and the Beast (1993)
- Walt Disney's Winnie the Pooh and the Little Lost Bird (1993)
- Walt Disney's Sleeping Beauty (1993)
- Black Beauty (1994)
- Tyrannosaurus Tex (1994)
- Disney's Toy Story (1995)
- Pie's in the Oven (1996)

=== Other books ===
- The Seven Wonders of Sassafras Springs (2005)
- The Princess and the Peabodys (2007)
- Tales from Winnie-the-Pooh / My Treasure Hunt Trouble (with A.A. Milne) (2011) (omnibus)

== Awards ==
Birney has won an Emmy Award, three Humanitas Prizes, and a Writers Guild of America Award.
