= Jenna Boyd =

American actress (born 1993)

- Born: Jenna Michelle Boyd; March 4, 1993 (age 33); Bedford, Texas, U.S.
- Education: Pepperdine University
- Occupation: Actress
- Years active: 2001–present
- Known for: Mary Christmas; The Missing; The Sisterhood of the Traveling Pants
- Spouse: Andrew Robert Bowers (m. 2024)
- Children: 1 Mack
- Relatives: Cayden Boyd (brother)

Jenna Boyd (born March 4, 1993) is an American actress. She began her career as a child actress with roles in the 2003 films The Hunted, Dickie Roberts: Former Child Star and The Missing, and the 2005 film The Sisterhood of the Traveling Pants. On television, she appeared on all four seasons of the Netflix comedy-drama Atypical (2017–2021).

== Early life, education and family ==
Boyd was born in Bedford, Texas. She was selected at age two in a modeling search. She and her parents and younger brother Cayden (also an actor) moved to Los Angeles to pursue her acting career. In September 2019, she moved to Tulsa, Oklahoma as part of the Tulsa Remote program.

She is a graduate of Pepperdine University, where she earned a business degree.

== Career ==
Boyd began her career at age three, appearing in episodes of the children's TV show Barney & Friends. She simultaneously acted and figure skated. In Dickie Roberts: Former Child Star she played the daughter of a family hired by the titular character (David Spade) to help him recapture his childhood. Boyd's big break came when she was cast in The Missing, alongside Cate Blanchett and Evan Rachel Wood. Although the film itself was not particularly well-received, critics praised Boyd's performance.

In 2005 Boyd played leukemia-suffering Bailey Graffman in The Sisterhood of the Traveling Pants. She appeared in the Lifetime miniseries The Gathering as the daughter of a doctor (Peter Gallagher) searching for his wife; and in the Ghost Whisperer episode "Children of Ghosts", as a troubled teenager living in a foster home. In 2017, she had the recurring role of Paige Hardaway, girlfriend of the autistic main character Sam Gardner, in the Netflix series Atypical.

In 2017 she stated that she had become a consultant for the multi-level marketing company Rodan + Fields.

== Filmography ==
Film
Year	Title	Role	Notes
2003	The Hunted	Loretta Kravitz	
2003	Dickie Roberts: Former Child Star	Sally Finley	
2003	The Missing	Dot Gilkeson	
2005	In an Instant	The Girl	
2005	The Sisterhood of the Traveling Pants	Bailey	
2012	Complicity	Rachel	
2012	Last Ounce of Courage	Maddie Rogers	
2014	Runaway	Abby	
2022	Good Mourning	Sabrina the Stalker	

Television
Year	Title	Role	Notes
2001	The Geena Davis Show	Kid	Episode: "Car Wash"
2001	Titus	5-Year-Old Shannon	Episode: "Shannon's Song"
2001	Just Shoot Me!	Hannah Gallo	Episode: "Christmas? Christmas!"
2002	Special Unit 2	N/A	voice role; episode: "The Piper"
2002	Six Feet Under	7-Year-Old Girl	Episode: "The Secret"
2002	CSI: Crime Scene Investigation	Sasha Rittle	Episode: "Cross Jurisdictions"
2002	Mary Christmas	Felice Wallace	TV movie
2003	Carnivàle	Maddy Crane	Episode: "Milfay"
2007	Ghost Whisperer	Julie Parker	Episode: "Children of Ghosts"
2007	The Gathering	Elizabeth 'Zee' Foster	TV miniseries
2008	Criminal Minds	Jessica Evanson	Episode: "Minimal Loss"
2016	Code Black	Vanessa	Episode: "Hero Complex"
2017–2021	Atypical	Paige Hardaway	Recurring role

== Awards and nominations ==
Year	Award	Category	Role	Result
2003	Young Artist Award	Best Performance in a TV Movie, Mini-Series or Special – Supporting Young Actress	Felice Wallace in Mary Christmas	Nominated
2004	Young Artist Award	Best Performance in a Feature Film – Supporting Young Actress	Sally Finney in Dickie Roberts: Former Child Star	Nominated
2004	Young Artist Award	Best Performance in a Feature Film – Leading Young Actress	Dot Gilkeson in The Missing	Won
2004	Phoenix Film Critics Society Awards	Best Performance by a Youth in a Lead or Supporting Role – Female	Dot Gilkeson in The Missing	Nominated
2004	Las Vegas Film Critics Society Awards	Youth in Film	Dot Gilkeson in The Missing	Nominated
2004	Saturn Award	Best Performance by a Younger Actor	Dot Gilkeson in The Missing	Nominated
2005	Teen Choice Award	Choice Movie Breakout Performance – Female	Bailey Graffman in The Sisterhood of the Traveling Pants	Nominated
2006	Young Artist Award	Best Performance in a Feature Film – Supporting Young Actress	Bailey Graffman in The Sisterhood of the Traveling Pants	Nominated
2008	Young Artist Award	Best Performance in a TV Series – Guest Starring Young Actress	Julie Parker in Ghost Whisperer	Nominated
