= Holiday Affair (1996 film) =

1996 film by Alan Myerson

- Poster movie
- Genre: Comedy; Romance
- Based on: Holiday Affair; 1949 film by Don Hartman
- Story by: John D. Weaver
- Directed by: Alan Myerson
- Starring: Cynthia Gibb; David James Elliott; Curtis Blanck
- Music by: Lee Holdridge
- Country of origin: United States
- Original language: English

Production
- Executive producers: Ted Hartley; Robert O'Connor
- Producer: Vicky Herman
- Cinematography: Dennis Smith
- Editor: Alex Hubert
- Running time: 87 minutes
- Production companies: USA Network; RKO Pictures; Jones Programming Partners

Original release
- Network: USA Network
- Release: December 15, 1996

Holiday Affair is a 1996 American Christmas comedy film, directed by Alan Myerson with a story by John D. Weaver. It is a remake of the 1949 RKO film of the same name which starred Robert Mitchum and Janet Leigh.

== Cast ==
- Cynthia Gibb as Jodie Ennis
- David James Elliott as Steve Mason
- Curtis Blanck as Timmy Ennis
- Al Waxman as Mr. Corley
- Tom Irwin as Paul Davis
- George R. Robertson (as George Robertson)
- Patricia Hamilton as Susan Ennis
- Victor Ertmanis
- Pam Hyatt as Emily Chambers (as Pamela Hyatt)
- Christina Collins
- James Binkley
- Allegra Fulton
- Derek Keurvorst
- Avril Garrett
- Jesse Cairns
- Boyd Banks
- David Huband

== See also ==
- Holiday Affair (1949)
- List of Christmas films
