= Volcano: Fire on the Mountain =

- Genre: Action; Drama
- Screenplay by: Craig Spector; Steve Womack
- Story by: Merrill H. Karp; Donna Ebbs; Scott Weinstein
- Directed by: Graeme Campbell
- Starring: Dan Cortese; Cynthia Gibb; Brian Kerwin
- Music by: David Michael Frank
- Country of origin: United States
- Original language: English

Production
- Executive producers: John Davis; Merrill H. Karpf
- Producers: George Horie; David Roessell
- Cinematography: Tobias A. Schliessler
- Editor: Michael Schweitzer
- Running time: 96 minutes
- Production companies: Davis Entertainment; Pacific Motion Pictures

Original release
- Network: ABC
- Release: February 23, 1997

Volcano: Fire on the Mountain is a 1997 American television disaster film starring Cynthia Gibb and Dan Cortese, with a twin films plot essentially identical to Dante's Peak and similar theme/name to Volcano, both theatrically released the same year.

== Plot ==
The film begins with a newlywed couple skiing down the flanks of Angel Lakes Peak, a dormant volcano close to the ski resort town Angel Lakes. Without any warning, a volcanic fissure opens up right before them, killing both in the process.

Peter Slater, a volcanologist working and living in a small mountain town, observes the volcanic activity on his screen. The following day the area is struck by minor earthquakes, and animals on the mountain are killed by volcanic gases emitted from fumaroles. Peter concludes a major eruption is imminent, though neither his boss nor his ex-girlfriend Kelly Adams, a ranger working for the local mountain patrol, believe him. Shortly afterwards Kelly and her colleagues are almost killed by volcanic gases while searching for the missing couple, only to be rescued by Peter. Kelly, now convinced that the mountain is posing a threat to the town, attempts to warn the mayor together with Peter, demanding an evacuation. As the tourist season is at its peak at that time, the mayor refuses, fearing tourists and investors might avoid the town and cause an economic downturn. A major earthquake strikes, destroying the roads leading to the town and stranding tourists and inhabitants. Peter and Kelly hike up the mountain to collect samples of volcanic debris from the crater. On their way up, a volcanic eruption suddenly occurs.

The eruption cause damages to vehicles, as well an earthquake devastates the town. Leaving dozens of people killed and hundreds injured. Peter and Kelly survive the blast, descend the mountain, and reach the town safely. Peter believes, a second eruption of greater force could occur and produce a lava flow that eventually obliterates the town entirely. As the roads are still unusable and rescue attempts by helicopter are now impossible due to volcanic ash, there is no way of evacuating the town fast enough. Eventually, the volcano violently erupts again, which gives Kelly the idea (due to Angel Lakes Peak and some others nearby being snowcapped) of using a controlled snow avalanche to stop the lava flow. Peter objects, though he quickly realizes there are no other options to save the town and the people. The two then set out skiing to plant explosives to set off a controlled avalanche to stop the flow, but in attempting to escape the resulting avalanche, Peter gets buried, and Kelly makes it into town to witness the result, the snow avalanche blocking off (and solidifying) the lava flow. At that point, Peter manages to dig himself out from the snow and return to town, after which he and Kelly rekindle their romance.
