= Aliens in America =

American sitcom

- The cast of Aliens in America
- Genre: Sitcom
- Created by: David Guarascio; Moses Port
- Starring: Dan Byrd; Adhir Kalyan; Amy Pietz; Lindsey Shaw; Scott Patterson
- Opening theme: "(What's So Funny 'Bout) Peace, Love, and Understanding" by PJ Olsson & Salman Ahmad
- Country of origin: United States
- Original language: English
- No. of seasons: 1
- No. of episodes: 18

Production
- Executive producers: David Guarascio; Moses Port; Tim Doyle
- Production locations: Vancouver, British Columbia, Canada
- Camera setup: Single-camera setup
- Running time: 22 minutes
- Production companies: CBS Paramount Network Television; Guarascio/Port Productions; Mr. Bigshot Fancy-Pants Productions; Warner Bros. Television

Original release
- Network: The CW
- Release: October 1, 2007 – May 18, 2008

Aliens in America is an American sitcom created by David Guarascio and Moses Port that aired on The CW for one season from October 1, 2007, to May 18, 2008. Guarascio and Port also served as executive producers of the show alongside Tim Doyle. Luke Greenfield directed the pilot. The show is about an American teenager in Wisconsin whose family takes in a Muslim foreign exchange student from Pakistan.

== Plot ==
High schooler Justin Tolchuck is a sensitive 16-year-old just trying to fit in at his high school in Medora, Wisconsin. He lives with his well-meaning mom Franny, entrepreneur dad Gary, and younger sister Claire, who is trying to raise her popularity in school. When school guidance counselor Mr. Matthews convinces the family to take in an international student, they accept him with the expectation that he will be a good-looking European or Latin American student who will make Justin popular. Although initially dismayed when Raja Musharraf, a 16-year-old Muslim boy from Pakistan, turns up, they soon warm up to him. Although their cultures are different, Justin and Raja form an unlikely friendship that might allow them to get past the social nightmare of high school. Justin especially feels compelled to stick by Raja when he starts to notice the blatant racist and xenophobic attitudes of his classmates and community.

== Cast ==
=== Main cast ===
- Dan Byrd as Justin Tolchuck
- Adhir Kalyan as Raja Musharaff
- Amy Pietz as Franny Tolchuck
- Scott Patterson as Gary Tolchuck
- Lindsey Shaw as Claire Tolchuck

=== Recurring cast ===
- Christopher B. Duncan as Mr. Matthews
- Adam Rose as Dooley
- Chad Krowchuk as Brad
- Nolan Gerard Funk as Todd Palladino
- Avan Jogia as Sam
- April Telek as Leslie Becker

== Production and broadcast history ==
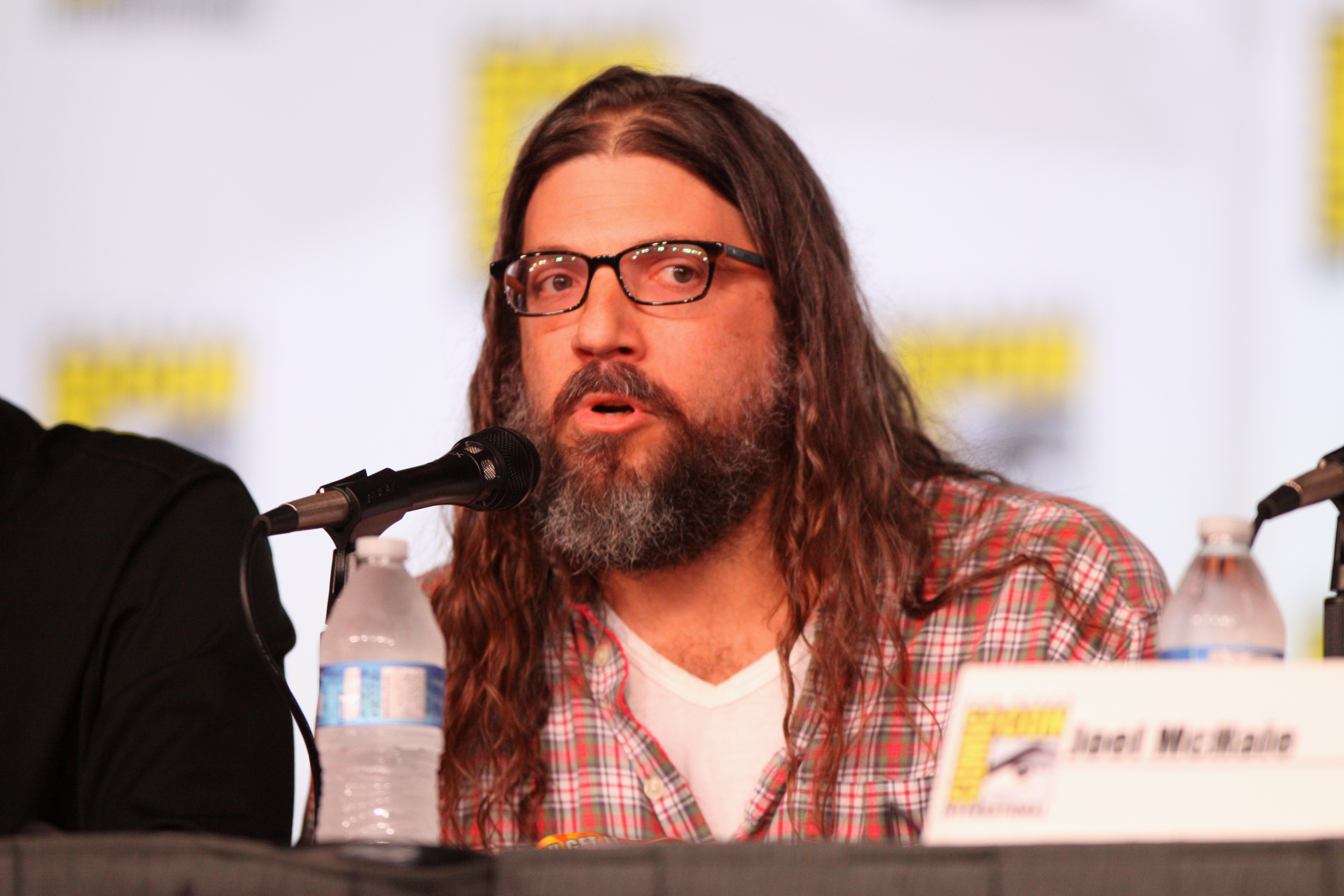
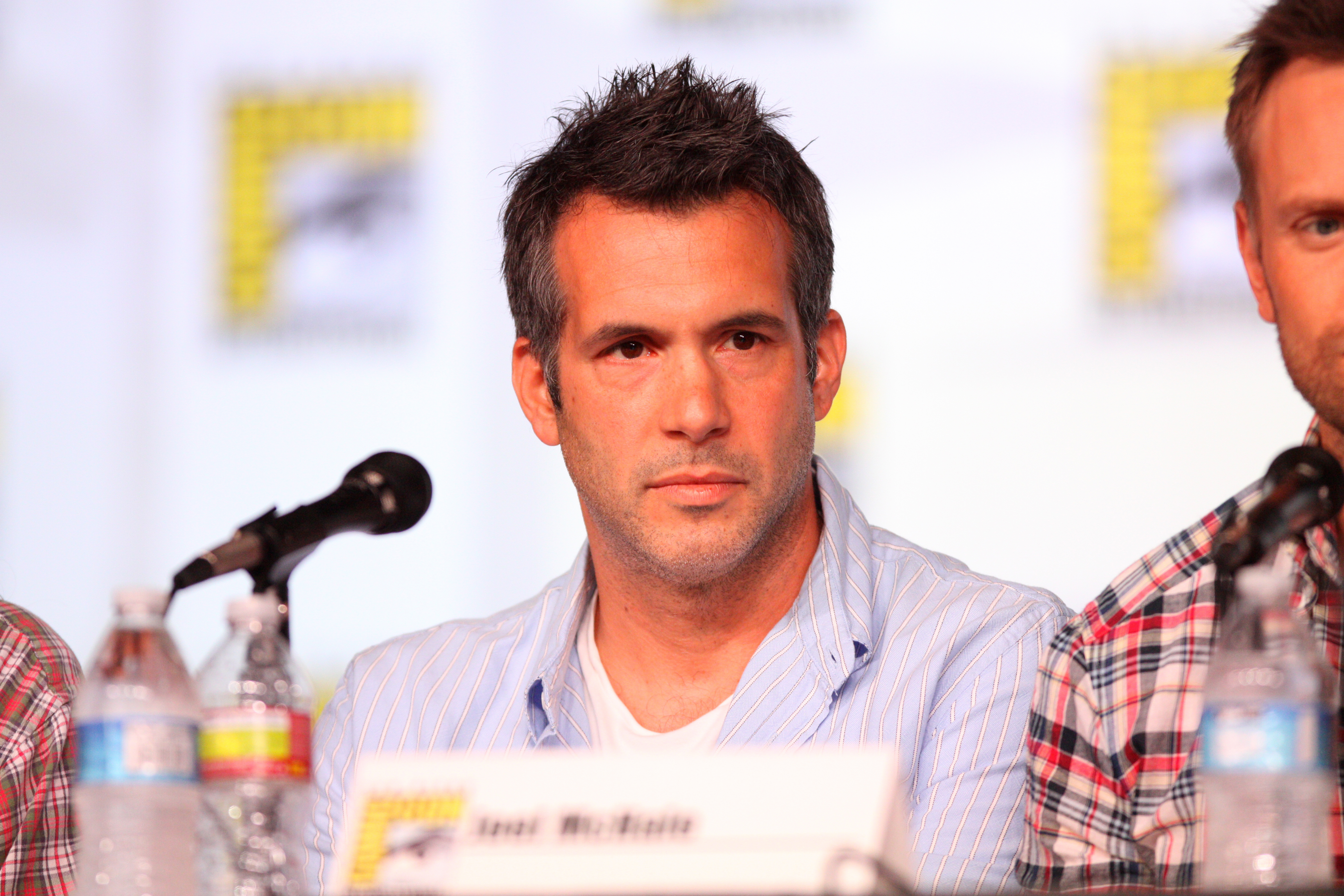
Aliens in America creators David Guarascio (left) and Moses Port (right) at a San Diego Comic-Con panel for Community in July 2012.

Produced by CBS Paramount Network Television, the series was officially green-lit and given a thirteen-episode order on May 15, 2007. It premiered on October 1, 2007, and aired on Monday nights at 8:30PM Eastern/7:30PM Central on The CW, following Everybody Hates Chris. The show was originally to be produced by NBC Universal Television (now Universal Television). It was filmed around the Vancouver, British Columbia, Canada, area. The high school featured in the show is actually H. J. Cambie Secondary School in Richmond, British Columbia, Canada, with the interiors of later first-season episodes shot inside a studio. Beginning on February 10, 2008, Aliens in America moved to Sunday nights (along with the rest of the Monday night comedies) and aired at 8:30PM Eastern/7:30PM Central. On May 9, 2008, TV Guide announced the cancellation of the series. After the show's cancellation, reruns aired on Universal HD.

Patrick Breen was originally cast as Gary Tolchuc, but the role was re-cast in July 2007.

== Episodes ==
No.	Title	Directed by	Written by	Original release date	Prod. code	Viewers (millions)
1	"Pilot"	Luke Greenfield	David Guarascio & Moses Port	October 1, 2007	101	2.34
Justin Tolchuck has nearly everything any teenager could want: caring parents, a popular sister, and his own style. However, the one thing that Justin does lack is a social life. His mother, Franny, tries to fix this problem by hosting a foreign student who can perhaps make Justin popular. However, the Tolchucks are in for a very big surprise when the foreigner turns out to be not at all what they had expected.
2	"No Man Is an Island"	Gail Mancuso	Emily Kapnek	October 8, 2007	103	2.11
Raja explains to his class how close he and Justin are, prompting rumors about the two being a couple to spread throughout the school. Thus, Justin turns to Claire for help, who advises him to completely ignore Raja. This later causes Justin to be more alone than ever because Raja instead befriends the geekiest kid in school. Meanwhile, Gary decides to get involved when Claire decides to call it quits with Jeffrey.
3	"Rocket Club"	Luke Greenfield	Richard Day	October 15, 2007	102	2.25
When Franny loses her sense of boundaries and requests that Gary remove the locks from all the doors, Justin and his friends find time for themselves by creating the Rocket Club, which is their secret excuse to hang out and do whatever they want. Raja, however, does not fit in well with the group because he does not like the fact that all they do is nothing. Justin also uses Raja's computer to look up porn and gets caught by the police.
4	"The Metamorphosis"	Michael Zinberg	Sam Laybourne	October 22, 2007	106	2.36
All of the guys suddenly become angry at Raja when he encourages the hottest girl in school to dress more decently. Meanwhile, Claire suddenly becomes the head of the A-List crowd and Franny decides to focus her attention to Gary's wardrobe once Justin tells her it's time for him to get his own clothes.
5	"Help Wanted"	Linda Mendoza	Robia Rashid	October 29, 2007	105	2.01
Gary is ashamed to tell the family he's been fired from his job, so he tries to get everyone to cut costs. Not wanting to be a burden on the family, Raja gets a job at a convenience store, much to Gary's delight. Justin and his pals Craig and Dooley are thrilled when they go to visit Raja at work and discover that the convenience store parking lot is the cool kids' hang-out. Everything is fine until Raja upsets the natural balance by refusing to sell liquor to kids with fake I.D. cards.
6	"Homecoming"	Dennie Gordon	Michael Glouberman	November 5, 2007	104	1.78
Justin is looking forward to serving on the Homecoming Junior Float committee, where his idea for the previous years float was a big hit. However, when Raja innocently questions Justin's new idea for a float and the committee chooses Raja's idea over Justin's, a feud begins between the two friends. Meanwhile, Franny secretly tries on Claire's new, sexy Homecoming dress, which Gary finds irresistible. When he learns that the revealing dress belongs to Claire, however, he forbids her to wear it out of the house.
7	"Purple Heart"	Fred Savage	Story by : Adam F. Goldberg; Teleplay by : Michael Glouberman	November 12, 2007	109	1.99
Much to the family's surprise, Raja begins smoking due to midterms stress. Meanwhile, Claire is heartbroken when Jeffrey breaks up with her and when Justin tries to cheer her up she embarrasses him in front of the kids at school. However, Claire soon finds herself trying to regain Justin's affections.
8	"My Musky, Myself"	Andy Fickman	Emily Kapnek	November 19, 2007	108	1.37
Claire forces Justin to become the school's mascot Musky, the Fish; but just the thought of performing makes Justin vomit from nervousness. So Raja takes over the job and the crowd goes wild for his gravity-defying moves. When Raja's enthusiasm leads to a confrontation with a spectator, Justin realizes he must face his fears and make Franny proud. Meanwhile, when a still-unemployed Gary realizes he is not needed at home, he accidentally stumbles into a relationship with surrogate family who loves having him around.
9	"Junior Prank"	John Fortenberry	Richard Day	November 26, 2007	107	1.89
Justin and Raja are excited when they are asked to participate in the annual Junior Prank. The plan is to flood the teachers' lounge, but Raja finds the idea too destructive and convinces Justin to sabotage the prank. When they accidentally flood the football field instead, they incur the wrath of the entire school. Meanwhile, Gary tries to make up for losing his job by getting all the money possible out of his alpacas, and recruits Claire to care for them. Finally, Franny tries to earn more money by selling most of the family's possessions.
10	"Church"	Michael Fresco	Rob Ulin	December 10, 2007	111	1.84
As Christmas approaches, Raja mentions that the Tolchucks' trip to the local mega-store every Sunday seems to be their substitute for church. Franny is horrified that Raja thinks the family is spiritually bankrupt and insists that they resume attending church, despite Gary's lack of enthusiasm. When Claire requests birth control pills for Christmas, Franny insists that she join the church's chastity group and take the role of Mary in the Christmas play. This plan backfires when Claire and the boy who plays Joseph are strongly attracted to one another. Meanwhile, when Justin discovers that some of his prayers are being answered, he begins praying to have sex with a girl in his class. Unfortunately, his friend Dooley is praying for the same thing, causing a rift between the two boys.
11	"Mom's Coma"	Michael Spiller	Rob Ulin	March 2, 2008	110	1.10
Justin becomes the target of Trey, the biggest, scariest bully at school. Justin is surprised and relieved to find that he can play on Trey's emotions by making up a story that Franny is in a coma. Raja chastises Justin for such a terrible lie, but when Trey threatens to beat him up, Raja joins in the deception. Meanwhile, Franny accidentally bumps a parked car and leaves a note. When she tells Gary what happened he tries to retrieve the note, but accidentally crashes into the same car, causing real damage.
12	"Hunting"	Daisy Mayer	Robia Rashid	March 9, 2008	112	1.17
When the high school conducts career aptitude testing, Raja is told he should become a doctor, but Justin shows no aptitude for any particular career. Franny and Gary put so much pressure on Justin to choose a career path, that he escapes to the home of his buddy Dooley, where he notices that Dooley's father is a stay-at-home dad. Justin's announcement that he has found his calling and plans to stay home and nurture his future family convinces Gary that a "manly" hunting trip with the boys is in order. Unfortunately, Raja's fascination with Gary's crossbow results in an embarrassing accident. Meanwhile, the normally close mother/daughter relationship between Franny and Claire turns combative and leads to a confrontation in a local nightclub.
13	"Community Theater"	Michael Fresco	Sam Laybourne	March 16, 2008	113	0.91
Franny's community theater group puts on a production of Rent, and when she can't get Justin to audition for a part, she convinces him to at least join the stage crew so they can have some quality mother/son time. When Justin meets the cute, artsy leading actress Zoe, he auditions for the male lead and lands the part, giving him an excuse to spend time with Zoe. The two become inseparable, but the friendship is damaged when Zoe discovers that Justin has let his buddies believe that he and Zoe are having sex. Meanwhile, Claire joins the teen hotline at school, but finds that she isn't able to help anyone. Feeling bad for her, Raja calls in using a fake name and an American accent and begins telling Claire his troubles.
14	"One Hundred Thousand Miles"	Fred Savage	Richard Day	March 23, 2008	114	0.91
The Tolchucks are set to fly to Vancouver for a family vacation, but when Raja begins praying at the airport, the family is questioned and the trip is postponed. Feeling that the family resents him and has never understood him, Raja leaves the Tolchuck's home and asks Mr. Matthews to place him with a new family. Guilt-ridden and frantic to find Raja, the Tolchucks turn to the local mosque, where Franny and Claire meet a Muslim mother and teenage daughter who are hosting a German exchange student. Meanwhile, Gary and Justin set off in search of Raja and share a rare father/son bonding moment.
15	"The Muslim Card"	Linda Mendoza	Emily Kapnek	April 27, 2008	115	1.07
Raja befriends an annoying girl named Mindy, feeling that she is unfairly ostracized by the other students. After spending a day studying with her, Raja realizes how truly annoying Mindy can be and is horrified when Justin tells him Mindy believes she and Raja are dating. Trying to let her down gently, Raja tells Mindy they cannot date because of their religious differences. The next day, Mindy shows up in a burka and tells Raja she has converted to Islam so they can be together, forcing Raja to tell her the truth. Meanwhile, Gary and Franny hit it off with the new neighbors Ted and Leslie, but are shocked when Ted tells them he must notify all his neighbors that he is a registered sex offender.
16	"Smutty Books"	Fred Savage	Rob Ulin	May 4, 2008	116	1.02
When Justin's English class is assigned the book Madame Bovary, one of the PTA moms begins a campaign to ban "smutty books" from the school curriculum, leading both Justin and Franny to actually read the books for the first time. Claire tries to get out of reading Pride and Prejudice by claiming it should also be banned. Meanwhile, Justin is embarrassed when his parents discover that he has been secretly drawing naked women for years and turns to a bewildered Raja for help.
17	"Wake at the Lake"	Sarah Pia Anderson	Michael Glouberman	May 11, 2008	117	1.14
As an extracurricular activity, Raja joins Students Against Drunk Driving and is given the job of organizing the annual event - a fake funeral for a student who was killed in a drunk-driving crash. Because the chosen victim has traditionally been the school's most popular student, everyone expects Raja to select Dan Archer, but Raja rebels and gives the dubious honor to Justin. When Dan Archer decides to hold his own funeral - the Wake at the Lake - Justin decides to go all out to attract mourners, and the competition escalates until Justin receives a sobering reminder of what the event is really about.
18	"Raja at Sixteen"	Fred Savage	Richard Day	May 18, 2008	118	1.28
Justin notices that Raja is obsessed with Sadika Sadaqatmal, one of the few Muslim girls in Medora (from the same family who were hosting the foreign student in episode 14 - "One Hundred Thousand Miles"). When Franny hears about Raja's interest in a girl, she immediately arranges for a date which requires the attendance of every member of the Tolchuck and Sadaqatmal families. Justin is stung when his parents comment that even Raja has begun dating while Justin has yet to find a girlfriend, so he asks out a neurotic girl named Donna. Meanwhile, Claire begins dating a German exchange student who lives with the Sadaqatmal family.

== U.S. Nielsen ratings ==
Rating information is from Your Entertainment Now and The Futon Critic. The weekly rating information is from ABC Medianet.

Aliens in America averaged 1.59 million viewers in its sole season.

#	Episode	Rating	Share	Rating/Share (18-49)	Viewers (millions)	Rank (timeslot)	Rank (week)
1	"Pilot"	1.6	2	0.8/2	2.34	5	98/102
2	"No Man Is an Island"	1.3	2	0.8/2	2.11	5	93/97
3	"Rocket Club"	1.5	2	0.9/2	2.25	5	93/97
4	"The Metamorphosis"	1.6	2	0.9/2	2.36	5	92/97
5	"Help Wanted"	1.4	2	0.8/2	2.01	5	95/100
6	"Homecoming"	1.2	2	0.7/2	1.78	5	97/101
7	"Purple Heart"	1.3	2	0.8/2	1.99	5	97/101
8	"My Musky, Myself"	1.1	2	0.5/1	1.37	5	90/95
9	"Junior Prank"	1.3	2	0.7/1	1.89	5	93/98
10	"Church"	1.2	2	0.7/1	1.84	5	91/99
11	"Mom's Coma"	0.9	1	0.4/1	1.10	5	94/96
12	"Hunting"	0.8	1	0.4/1	1.17	5	94/96
13	"Community Theater"	0.6	1	0.4/1	0.91	5	99/100
14	"One Hundred Thousand Miles"	0.6	1	0.4/1	0.91	5	91/91
15	"The Muslim Card"	0.7	1	0.4/1	1.07	5	99/100
16	"Smutty Books"	0.8	1	0.4/1	1.02	5	95/96
17	"Wake in the Lake"	0.7	1	0.4/1	1.14	5	96/97
18	"Raja at Sixteen"	0.9	1	0.5/1	1.28	5	94/96

== International distribution ==
Country	TV network(s)	Series premiere	Weekly schedule (local time)
Australia	GO!	August 9, 2009	Sunday 9:00pm
Brazil	SBT	December 15, 2008	Sunday 3:30am
Bulgaria	HBO Comedy	2009	
Costa Rica	Teletica Canal 7	April 17, 2009	Fridays 8:00pm
Croatia	HRT 2	April 2009	Monday to Friday 4:40pm
Denmark	TV3		Sundays 7:00pm
Germany	ProSieben	April 25, 2009	Saturdays 2:00pm
Finland	MTV3	August 31, 2010	Thuesdays 2:10pm
France	Canal+	December 1, 2008	
India	Zee Café		Thursdays 10:00pm
Ireland	TV3		Sundays 5:30pm
Israel	Xtra HOT; HOT family	January 9, 2009	Fridays 9:45pm (3 episodes)
Italy	Joi	January 21, 2008	
Lithuania	TV1	August 23, 2009	Sundays 3:00pm
Mexico	Warner Channel	Summer 2008	Fridays 8:30pm, Saturdays 8:00pm
The Netherlands	RTL 5	Summer 2009	Mondays 8:30pm
New Zealand	TV2		Saturdays 7:00pm
Norway	TVNorge		Saturdays and Sundays 3:10pm
Poland	HBO Comedy		
Portugal	RTP2	September 15, 2008	Monday to Friday 8:40pm
Slovenia	Kanal A	September 23, 2009	Weekdays 3:40pm
South Africa	SABC 3		Friday 7:30pm
Spain	laSexta	July 6, 2009	Monday 1:30am
Sweden	Kanal 5		Fridays 6pm, Saturdays 3:25pm
Turkey	CNBC-e	September 9, 2009	Wednesdays 8:30 pm
Ukraine	MTV Ukraine	April 26, 2010	Monday to Friday 9:30 pm
Belgium	VT4	March 6, 2011	Sundays 1:00 and 2:00 pm

== See also ==
- List of cultural references to the September 11 attacks
