= Mary Christmas (film) =

- Genre: Drama; Christmas; Family
- Written by: Stanley M. Brooks; Betty G. Birney
- Directed by: John Schneider
- Starring: John Schneider; Cynthia Gibb; Jenna Boyd; Tom Bosley
- Music by: Joey Newman
- Country of origin: United States
- Original language: English

Production
- Executive producers: Stanley M. Brooks; Daniel Grodnik
- Producer: Timothy J. Warenz
- Cinematography: Paul Maibaum
- Editor: Warren Bowman
- Running time: 120 min.
- Production companies: Heartland Entertainment; Once Upon a Time Films; Paxson Communications Corporation

Original release
- Network: PAX TV
- Release: November 29, 2002

Mary Christmas is a 2002 American Christmas movie written by Stanley M. Brooks and Betty G. Birney. It was directed by and stars John Schneider. PAX TV (WPXP Channel 67) achieved its highest rated movie ever with the world premiere of "Mary Christmas" on November 29, 2002

== Plot ==
Joel Wallace (Schneider), is a widower raising a daughter, Felice (Jenna Boyd). In her Christmas letter to Santa Claus, Felice wishes for a new mother for Christmas. The letter is intercepted by a local news producer who cancels reporter Mary Maloney's vacation and sends her to investigate the Wallace family as a human interest story. Most of the movie deals with Joel's searching for a new wife that will be Felice's mother. Felice is searching for a mother, and Mary Maloney's is wishing for her daughter to be happy, the baby that she gave up nine years earlier; the real Santa Claus poses as a governor who has both letter's to Santa, and grants all of their wishes; The real daughter and mother are reunited as the father is given his old ball mitt he always loved!

== Cast ==
- Cynthia Gibb as Mary Maloney
- John Schneider as Joel Wallace
- Jenna Boyd as Felice Wallace
- Renee Ridgeley as Samantha Bruce
- Daniel Roebuck as Mac Reeves
- Tom Bosley as Les Turner
- Kandice Stroh as Monica
- Norm Thoeming as Hal
- Benton Jennings as Dan Charles
- Diane Robin as Rita Jackson
- Diana Holdridge as Charlene Abernathy
- Jeni Austin as Maria Archer (credited as Jeni D. Austin)
- Bill Rutoski as Tony
- Milos Milicevic as Leslie

== See also ==
- List of Christmas films
