= Atypical =

2017 American comedy-drama television series

- Poster for season 1
- Genre: Comedy drama; Coming-of-age
- Created by: Robia Rashid
- Starring: Jennifer Jason Leigh; Keir Gilchrist; Jack Haven (Note: Credited as Brigette Lundy-Paine); Amy Okuda; Michael Rapaport; Nik Dodani
- Composer: Dan Romer
- Country of origin: United States
- Original language: English
- No. of seasons: 4
- No. of episodes: 38

Production
- Executive producers: Robia Rashid; Seth Gordon; Mary Rohlich
- Producer: Jennifer Jason Leigh
- Production locations: Los Angeles, California
- Running time: 26–38 minutes
- Production companies: Exhibit A; Weird Brain, Inc.; Sony Pictures Television Studios

Original release
- Network: Netflix
- Release: August 11, 2017 – July 9, 2021

Atypical is an American comedy-drama television series created by Robia Rashid for Netflix. The series takes place in Connecticut, and focuses on the life of 18-year-old Samuel "Sam" Gardner (Keir Gilchrist), who is autistic. The first season was released on August 11, 2017, consisting of eight episodes. The 10-episode second season was released on September 7, 2018. In October 2018, the series was renewed for a third season of ten episodes, which was released on November 1, 2019. In February 2020, it was renewed for a fourth and final season, which premiered on July 9, 2021.

The first season received mostly positive reviews, but was criticized by some reviewers for its lack of autistic actors, and inaccuracies in its depiction of autism. The second season featured autistic actors and writers, giving them an opportunity to work and represent their community, and received mostly positive reviews. The third season continued this positive development and received overwhelmingly positive reviews.

== Cast and characters ==
=== Main ===
- Keir Gilchrist as Sam Gardner, an 18-year-old teenager who is autistic and has a special interest in Antarctica and loves penguins. Gilchrist said about the character, "He's one person that is on the autism spectrum. He's a very specific character."
- Jennifer Jason Leigh as Elsa Gardner, Sam and Casey's overprotective mother.
- Jack Haven as Casey Gardner, Sam's younger sister who also is very protective of him. She is very athletic and thanks to this gets a scholarship at a private school.
- Michael Rapaport as Doug Gardner, Sam and Casey's father and Elsa's husband. He works as an emergency medical technician.
- Nik Dodani as Zahid Raja, Sam's best friend, a "dweeby and foul-mouthed lothario"
- Amy Okuda as Julia Sasaki (seasons 1–2; recurring: season 3; guest: season 4), Sam's dedicated therapist, whom he briefly has a crush on.

=== Recurring ===
- Jenna Boyd as Paige Hardaway, Sam's high-achieving friend and later girlfriend.
- Graham Rogers as Evan Chapin, Casey's boyfriend from the beginning of the series. At the end of season 3, however, they split up as Casey realizes she is bisexual. He works at a local pizza place, but later decides to become an emergency medical technician like Doug.
- Christina Offley as Sharice (seasons 1–2 & 4; guest: season 3), Casey's childhood best friend.
- Kevin Daniels as Coach Briggs
- Rachel Redleaf as Beth Chapin, Evan's sister, who Casey stands up for after witnessing her get bullied for her weight.
- Ariela Barer as Bailey Bennett (seasons 1–2)
- Anthony Jacques as Christopher, Luisa's autistic son (seasons 1–2)
- Wendy Braun as Kathy
- Karl T. Wright as Chuck (seasons 1 & 3–4), Doug's EMT partner
- Raúl Castillo as Nick (season 1; guest: season 2), a bartender Elsa has an affair with and one of her friends
- Nina Ameri as Luisa, Elsa's friend and Christopher's mother
- Fivel Stewart as Izzie Taylor (seasons 2–4), a student at Casey's new school. A fellow runner, she becomes Casey's best friend, and later, girlfriend.
- Kimmy Gatewood as Coach Crowley (seasons 2–4)
- Angel Laketa Moore as Megan (seasons 2–4), Doug's female friend & confidante from the Autism support group.
- Domonique Brown as Jasper (seasons 2–4) a student in the peer group who later enrolls at Denton.
- Layla Weiner as Amber (seasons 2–3), Megan's daughter.
- Naomi Rubin as Noelle (seasons 2–4), a girl in Sam's peer group who later attends Denton with Jasper and Sid.
- Graham Phillips as Nate (season 2; guest: season 3), Izzie's ex-boyfriend.
- Casey Wilson as Ms. Whitaker (season 2)
- Major Curda as Arlo (season 2; guest: season 1)
- Jeff Rosenthal as Bob (seasons 3–4; guest: seasons 1–2), Sam and Zahid's boss at Techtropolis.
- Sara Gilbert as Professor Judd (seasons 3–4), Sam's ethics professor at Denton University.
- Allie Rae Fossum as Gretchen (seasons 3–4), Zahid's disgraced troublemaking girlfriend.
- Kimia Behpoornia as Abby (seasons 3–4), Sam's friend.
- Eric McCormack as Professor Shinerock (season 3), Sam's art professor at Denton University.
- Tal Anderson as Sid (seasons 3–4) a new friend that Sam meets while she is volunteering at the Denton Disability Services office.
- Jenny O'Hara as Lillian (seasons 3–4), Elsa's mother.

== Episodes ==
=== Series overview ===
Season	Episodes	Originally released
1	8	August 11, 2017
2	10	September 7, 2018
3	10	November 1, 2019
4	10	July 9, 2021

=== Season 1 (2017) ===
No. overall	No. in season	Title	Directed by	Written by	Original release date
1	1	"Antarctica"	Seth Gordon	Robia Rashid	August 11, 2017
Sam has a session with his therapist Julia, in which he learns that autistic people can date. Sam begins to look for a relationship, encouraged by his friend Zahid, with whom he works at Techtropolis, an electronics and appliance store. He goes on an unsuccessful date with a girl he met through online dating, and then another, where he asks out a woman in Techtropolis and ends up pushing her off the bed when she starts to touch him unexpectedly. Meanwhile, Sam's sister Casey is suspended from her high school for punching Bailey Bennett, a fellow student and daughter of the school's primary financial backer who graffitied "ORCA" on the locker of an overweight student, Beth Chapin. Beth makes Casey a chocolate cake out of gratitude, bringing her brother Evan with her. Evan asks Casey out and though she rejects him at first, they begin to hang out. To take her mind off worrying about Sam, Elsa goes on a date with her husband Doug and starts a dance class. She goes to a bar with women from the class and spends the night talking to a bartender named Nick.
2	2	"A Human Female"	Michael Patrick Jann	Mike Oppenhuizen	August 11, 2017
Sam is distressed to learn that Julia has a boyfriend, as he is interested in dating her. Doug gives Sam advice without realizing the girl he likes is Julia and Zahid encourages Sam to pursue Julia. Sam is mocked and taunted after he approaches Bailey and Arlo and asks them questions about how to "steal a woman", likely having misinterpreted the figure of speech. Doug consoles Sam and tells him that relationships are difficult, but one shouldn't give up. He gives Sam a lift to Julia's house so he can leave her chocolate-covered strawberries. To Doug's alarm, Sam breaks into Julia's house. Doug, horrified, then realizes whose house it is and drags him away before anyone sees him. Meanwhile, Elsa discovers that she left her credit card at the bar, and picks it up. She is hit by a dart on her way out, so Nick puts a plaster on her wound, and they exchange phone numbers. Casey's friends tell her that Evan was arrested and expelled; Evan explains that it was for stealing brass instruments. He is upset that Casey finds the story funny, but then she kisses him.
3	3	"Julia Says"	Michael Patrick Jann	Brian Tanen	August 11, 2017
Whilst on a run together, Casey tells Doug about her first kiss. Doug is angry at Evan when he sees him with Casey. Casey learns from Sam that Doug left them for eight months in 2004, so she skips school, but Doug finds her and confesses what happened and how he regrets it. Meanwhile, after rejection by a girl, Sam gets a desire to vary his wardrobe. He goes shopping with Elsa and Zahid, but Zahid picks a jacket for him that he finds very uncomfortable, he later manages to get rid of it. In the corridor, a girl, Paige, compliments the whale T-shirt he bought. Elsa is concerned over the influence Julia has over Sam, and after Zahid tells her a story of him rubbing his butt against the car of a person with whom he was angry, she does the same thing to Julia's car. Nick has been texting her, and she responds. They meet up and have sex.
4	4	"A Nice Neutral Smell"	Seth Gordon	Annabel Oakes	August 11, 2017
After having sex with Nick, Elsa goes shopping and suddenly announces to a cashier that she cheated on her husband; throughout the episode she sees things that remind her of her affair. Casey wins an important 400m race, but though her family are at the game, they miss seeing her win as Elsa drops her phone and Sam grabs a girl's ponytail after repeatedly being slapped in the face by it. Following the race, Clayton Prep want to recruit her. Paige asks Sam to study with her, and after Julia encourages him to do so, Sam invites Paige to his house to study. Doug attends Elsa's weekly support group for parents of children with autism, where the group leader objects to him not using people-first language. Elsa makes a special family dinner, to which Casey invites Evan and Sam invites Zahid and Paige, both without asking Elsa. Paige steals Sam's notebook, looking for a pros and cons list he made about her. She is upset by the list and leaves during dinner. Sam follows her and asks her to be his girlfriend. Casey then tells her parents about Clayton Prep and Elsa replies that she probably cannot go because Sam relies on Casey being at the same school.
5	5	"That's My Sweatshirt!"	Michael Patrick Jann	Dennis Saldua	August 11, 2017
Elsa phones Nick angrily after he accidentally sends a birthday invitation to her. Paige and Sam hang out in their bedroom. He finds her loud and annoying so he makes her sit in his closet, though she does not mind and takes a sweatshirt of his, not realizing its importance. When Sam learns this, he begins to hide from her. Casey has an interview at Clayton Prep and is told by a friend that Sam is missing, but he is quickly found. The interviewer, a student at the school, talks to her about her brother's autism. The following day, Casey discourages Paige from dating Sam. Paige breaks up with Sam and returns his sweatshirt. Sam yells at Casey, telling her that he does not need her help. He bursts into Paige's French class with a penguin necklace for her, accidentally ruining the lesson in the process, and the pair kiss. Meanwhile, Julia's boyfriend Miles moves out of their house without warning, leaving only a note behind. Elsa and Doug have dinner with two of Doug's old friends, leading Elsa to realize that he never told anyone at his job that his son was autistic out of shame and embarrassment. Elsa goes over to Nick's house and they have sex again.
6	6	"The D-Train to Bone Town"	Michael Patrick Jann	Mike Oppenhuizen & Jen Regan	August 11, 2017
Paige wants Sam to go to the Winter Formal with her, but he objects because of the music. Elsa takes marijuana with Nick and bumps into her friend April, mentioning that Casey is planning to join Clayton Prep. Paige wants to have sex with Sam, so he buys condoms. The track team at Newton treat Casey weirdly after discovering she is leaving. Casey goes shopping with them and Sharice steals her clothes. While Elsa cuts her friend Luisa's hair, Sam is forced to hang out with her son Christopher, who is also autistic, and talks to Sam about sex. Paige proposes a "Silent Dance" for the Winter Formal, in which participants listen to the music through headphones, and the motion is passed, leading April to get angry at Elsa. Zahid takes Sam to a strip club, but he leaves immediately as the strobe lights are painful to him. A stripper outside talks to Sam and shows her breasts to him. Doug takes Julia to the emergency room after noticing her limping, and she tells him about her parents' reaction to her brother's autism. Doug apologizes to Elsa for not telling his work friends about Sam's autism. Sharice apologizes to Casey. Julia discovers that she is pregnant.
7	7	"I Lost My Poor Meatball"	Joe Kessler	Robia Rashid	August 11, 2017
Elsa makes cupcakes for the Winter Formal with friends from her support group. Without thinking, Paige tells Sam that she loves him, and she wants him to decide if he loves her before meeting her family on Thursday at an Olive Garden. Elsa walks in on Casey and Evan kissing and tells Casey that she is available to talk about sex if she wants. Casey replies that she is not having sex. Elsa goes to the bar, where a memorial is being held for a deceased staff member Meatball. Sam goes with his parents to Olive Garden, and they give him three criteria to decide if he is in love. Julia goes to Techtropolis to pick up a television and runs into Sam and Zahid; she shows Sam how to slow dance. Casey finds out she has received a scholarship to Clayton Prep and cycles to Evan's house to tell him the news. Elsa ends her affair with Nick, and as she gives him a parting kiss, Casey rides past on her bike and sees them. Casey arrives at Evan's house and they have sex. Afterward, Evan tells Casey that he loves her.
8	8	"The Silencing Properties of Snow"	Michael Patrick Jann	Robia Rashid	August 11, 2017
During dinner with Paige's family, Sam tells Paige that he does not love her. He asks Julia to be his girlfriend, and she realizes he broke into her house and starts yelling, before realizing her mistake, unfortunately, Sam runs off before she can stop him. Repeating the four species of Antarctic penguin for reassurance, Sam gets on the bus, repeating the list louder and louder while rocking back and forth before collapsing, resulting in the bus driver hurriedly calling his parents, knowing that Sam has gone into autistic meltdown. Doug argues with Julia. As Casey has been ignoring him, Evan goes to her house, but she yells at him to leave. Paige yells at Sam, saying that she lost the necklace. Casey confronts Nick. Sam finds Paige's necklace in the school swimming pool and gets soaked retrieving it. Casey asks Sam if he wants her to turn her scholarship down, but he says he will be fine without her. Sam and Paige meet in the Winter Formal in an igloo which Doug made; Sam apologizes to Paige and says he is unsure of his feelings. Paige says they should not get back together, but gives him a handjob. Casey and Evan reconcile and say that they love each other. Julia returns home to find Miles, who proposes to her. Doug finds a message Casey wrote on Elsa's to-do board, "Stop banging the bartender".

=== Season 2 (2018) ===
No. overall	No. in season	Title	Directed by	Written by	Original release date
9	1	"Juiced!"	Joe Kessler	Robia Rashid	September 7, 2018
Sam is upset, as it is the time in his week when he usually has an appointment with Julia, but she is no longer his therapist, as him being in love with her creates a conflict of interest. In a flashback, Doug punches a hole in the wall after learning Elsa had an affair. He leaves the house to stay with his father. At dinner, Casey is passive-aggressive towards Elsa and leaves to go for a run. Sam and Paige speak over video call. Casey and Evan kiss in her room, despite interruptions from Sam and Elsa. Sam searches for a new therapist, but does not like the ones he meets. Elsa begs Kathy, from her support group, to get an appointment with Dr. Brob. Casey returns her gym uniform to Coach Briggs. At home, she tries on her new uniform and is angry at Elsa for tailoring her blazer after she asked her not to. Casey mentions that Elsa cheated on Doug, then realizes that Sam is present. Elsa explains to him why Doug left. Finding Casey moved his toothbrush again, he throws juice over her while she is wearing her uniform and she attacks him, though Elsa quickly pulls her off him. Sam goes to Julia's office, and they talk briefly. Doug returns home and consoles Casey. He tells Elsa she needs to leave. Casey reconciles with Sam, and he buys her pencils for school. Kathy leaves her kitten with Elsa to take care of, in exchange for speaking to Dr. Brob for her.
10	2	"Penguin Cam and Chill"	Ryan Case	Robia Rashid	September 7, 2018
Elsa is staying at Luisa's house, to the disappointment of her son Christopher. She visits home to see her kids go back to school, but they act distant towards her. At Clayton Prep, Casey introduces herself to Izzie, who warns her not to cause drama. Paige tells Sam she wants a "casual" relationship and kisses him. Casey struggles to find her classrooms and keep up with the difficult nature of the lessons. Zahid explains to Sam what a casual relationship means. Elsa gets bangs. Sam gets Paige to define rules for their relationship. The next day, Casey arrives in uniform on casual dress day and does not have a Flex card to purchase canteen food with. As she accidentally mistakes his locker for hers, Casey meets Nate, Izzie's boyfriend. Doug meets Elsa at a coffee shop to give her a list of rules. The next day, Casey still cannot get lunch, but Nate gives her pizza. Sam goes to Paige's house, as she is upset after getting waitlisted for Bowdoin College. Finding out that Sam didn't tell her about Elsa's affair, Paige ends their relationship. Kathy gets her kitten back from Elsa.
11	3	"Little Dude and the Lion"	Silver Tree	Theresa Mulligan Rosenthal	September 7, 2018
At a meeting with Sam and his parents, Ms. Whitaker discusses Sam's plan for college and recommends a support group she runs for people with autism who are Sam's age. Overwhelmed in a lesson by the noise of the other students, Sam runs away and is hit by a slow-moving car in the parking lot. He gets up and hides in a supply closet. Julia and Miles bicker in front of one of her friends. Izzie falls over while running and blames Casey, so a teacher makes them sit in the same room until their issues are resolved. Izzie receives a distressing call, which leads her and Casey to talk about how Izzie takes care of her three siblings and Casey takes care of Sam. They bond and drink vodka together, which Izzie stole from a friend's locker. Sam attends the support group, where they discuss change, while Doug bonds with another member's mother and offers to show her daughter inside his ambulance. Meanwhile, Elsa expects them to turn up to Dr. Brob's office as they had agreed. Sam asks Paige to walk with him between classes sometimes. Casey goes to Evan's house, still drunk, and wants to have sex with him, though he ignores her. Elsa confronts Doug about being late to the appointment with Dr. Brob. Sam comes downstairs and announces that he wants to go to college. Evan calls Elsa about Casey being drunk.
12	4	"Pants on Fire"	Geeta Patel	Mike Oppenhuizen	September 7, 2018
After he submits a college application essay written about seeing a stripper's breasts, Ms. Whitaker suggests Sam should write the essay about his autism. Casey encourages him to lie, so he goes to Elsa, telling her she is the biggest liar he knows. Casey and Evan call; Evan makes jokes about Casey's behavior when drunk. In Elsa's support group, she talks about her lying. Julia goes for an ultrasound exam and realizes her hormones have been affecting her mood. The doctor puts the baby's gender and sonogram in an envelope which Julia can open if she wants. Zahid helps Sam learn to lie. Sam practices by telling Paige lies, and she accidentally slices her fingertip off on a paper guillotine after he pretends he has a sexual partner. Encouraged by her friends, Elsa starts a haircutting business for children with autism. Doug has a panic attack after a phone call to Elsa. Julia runs into Elsa and tells her that she's pregnant, and the two reconcile. After Zahid is caught smoking marijuana twice, Sam tells Bob, their boss, the marijuana was his so that Zahid is not fired. Evan comes to visit Casey, who is still embarrassed; Evan shows her an embarrassing childhood video of himself to cheer her up. After Elsa says she is trying to be more honest, Doug asks her questions about her affair. Julia opens the envelope and calls her mother to say she is having a boy. Sam writes about his autism and Zahid in his essay. Doug has a panic attack and collapses after hearing Elsa still thinks about Nick.
13	5	"The Egg Is Pipping"	Wendey Stanzler	Bob Smiley	September 7, 2018
In a flashback, Elsa and Doug react to discovering Sam is autistic: Elsa discusses therapies, while Doug wants a third opinion. In the present, Doug denies to Elsa that his collapse was a panic attack, and refuses her help around the house until Casey convinces him to her stay at the house. When someone in Sam's support group is surprised he does not have a bank account, Doug takes him to set one up. At Izzie's suggestion, Casey goes to dinner with friends from Clayton Prep and Evan tags along. He is surprised to see how she acts around her school friends, particularly Nate, and upset when she interjects with "but he's really smart" after he says he goes to a technical school. Doug recites the four species of Antarctic penguin, at Sam's suggestion, to calm down when he becomes panicked. Sam has $700 he wants to give to charity and classmate Arlo convinces him to give him the money for a penguin-themed party. Sam tells Elsa about it and she calls Arlo's mother, thinking it is a school-sanctioned event. Doug shows a girl from Sam's support group around his ambulance, chatting to her mother about his situation with Elsa. Doug offers Elsa chop suey for dinner and she dresses up for it, but he ate his meal separately and left. Arlo smashes Sam's phone when Arlo's parents realized he was planning a party from Elsa's call. Sam goes to the supply closet and unsuccessfully tries to use his broken phone. Bailey lends him hers and they watch the penguin egg. Casey and Evan argue after the dinner. When Sam asks, Doug clarifies that Elsa is living at home, but like roommates. The Gardner family watch Sam's egg hatching.
14	6	"In the Dragon's Lair"	Silver Tree	Robia Rashid	September 7, 2018
Sam buys Paige a stylus and she forgives him. A sleepwalker, Paige asks Sam to watch her during the school's lock-in. Doug sleeps in the sunroom. Izzie meets Sam, and they get along. Doug and Elsa go to visit Theo and Holly, Arlo's parents, who apologize for his behavior, returning the money and buying Sam a new phone. The four of them had been friends years ago, but stopped when Theo and Holly stopped inviting Sam to their camping trips because he was "difficult". Holly apologizes she and Elsa get along, Theo and Doug fall out when Theo is dismissive of Sam because of his autism. Sam eats dinner with Zahid's family and stays overnight to practice for the lock-in. Sam struggles to sleep in Zahid's room, so he goes for a walk around Zahid's neighborhood. A police officer stops Sam, but Sam does not understand the situation and continues walking, ignoring the officer. Zahid rushes in to explain that Sam has autism, but the cop ignores him and makes them get on the ground, arresting them. Nate arrives at Casey's, and Izzie falls asleep as they watch a movie. He tries to kiss Casey, but she jumps up and storms out. Zahid and Sam are taken into custody at the police station; Zahid helps Sam cope by telling him about his dream to become a nurse. The police officer lets Sam and Zahid go, but refuses to apologize.
15	7	"The Smudging"	Pam Thomas	Robia Rashid & Dennis Saldua	September 7, 2018
Sam calls Julia at the time his sessions used to be each week, his latest message is about him being apprehended by the police. Sam agrees to go the lock-in with Paige. Elsa suggests to Doug that because of his job, he should be the one to complain about Sam's arrest. Casey writes Izzie a letter saying that Nate attempted to kiss her; Izzie catches her trying to put it in her locker and reads it in front of her. Sam goes to his support group and Ms. Whitaker asks him to research colleges he may want to attend. Doug speaks to the officer who arrested Sam, and he puts Sam's face on a noticeboard in the station. Zahid talks to Sam about college. Evan and Casey talk about Nate; he sees Elsa trying to fix the hole on his way out. The next day, he comes to help fix it. Paige has been accepted to Bowdoin College and wants Sam to attend too. Nate claims to Izzie that Casey was the one who tried to initiate the kiss; she chooses to believe Nate. Julia calls Doug and tells him about Sam's voicemails. Casey encourages Sam to think for himself about his future. Anxious, he skips his appointment with Ms. Whitaker and hides in the supply closet; Bailey is impressed by his drawings and ask him to draw on her arm with a marker. Casey finds "slut" and "ho" written on her trainers and tries frantically to clean them. Paige overhears Sam and Bailey as she finishes painting a bench for the senior gift; she pulls the fire alarm after noticing Bailey's cigarette. The three are called into Ms. Whitaker's office and Sam and Bailey are assigned community service. Seeing his notebook, Ms. Whitaker notices Sam's artistic ability. After Elsa washes Casey's trainers, she sees the slurs on them and buys her a new pair. Doug suggests to Elsa that they work on a training program about autism for first responders. As they pick up litter around school, Bailey kisses Sam.
16	8	"Living at an Angle"	Pete Chatmon	Jen Regan & Theresa Mulligan Rosenthal	September 7, 2018
Sam shows his finished art portfolio to Casey and Evan, with which he is applying to the Rhode Island School of Design (RISD). Casey and Evan unintentionally make him anxious about the big life change. The track coach at Clayton has a meeting with Casey, warning that if she continues doing poorly in biology, she may lose her scholarship. At his group, Sam announces that he has an interview at RISD. Julia meets with Doug and Elsa to plan the training program for first responders, but Doug and Elsa begin talking about the state of their marriage. Sam realizes he has lost his portfolio during work with Zahid; they contact Casey, who stops studying to search his room. She comes to work and calms Sam down. They search Techtropolis and a sports place where Sam and Zahid recently went; Sam and Casey descend into argument. When they return home, a girl from Sam's support group—Amber—and her mother arrive to return the portfolio, which Amber had stolen. Casey apologizes to Sam and he helps her study biology. Julia calls Miles and breaks up with him; he is already in Africa working for Doctors Without Borders. Panicked, Sam runs away from the waiting room before his RISD interview. Ms. Whitaker recommends Denton University, which has a scientific illustration program. Elsa tells Doug about her intention of starting a haircutting business for autistic children. Doug suggests couple's therapy and Elsa joins him in a shower.
17	9	"Ritual-licious"	Ryan Case	Mike Oppenhuizen & D.J. Ryan	September 7, 2018
To her annoyance, Sam wakes Casey at 3:15 am on her 16th birthday to say "Happy birthday" to her sixteen times, the first of his many traditions for her birthday. In the afternoon, Casey goes driving for the first time, with Doug accompanying her. Meanwhile, Elsa has arranged a big surprise party for Casey, though Evan is concerned, as Casey wanted something small. Zahid works out that Sam has been kissing somebody and assumes it was Paige. As Casey arrives home, she is upset by the surprise party and refuses to do the next of Sam's rituals, finding the "Ickle Bickle" gorilla figurine that has been hidden in the house. He fears this will cause the death of his tortoise, after finding his previous tortoise dead the last time they failed to complete all the traditions, so he persuades Casey to do it anyway. Zahid lets slip to Paige that Sam has been kissing somebody. Paige confronts Sam about him kissing someone and then subsequently presumably leaves. As the girls from Clayton Prep arrive at the party, Casey angrily demands her mother get everyone to leave; as she storms upstairs, Sam tells her they need to look for the Ickle Bickle, but she snaps at him. Elsa talks to Sam about apologizing to Casey, but he finds the Ickle Bickle and runs off. Izzie comes to Casey's room to apologize and asks if they can "forehead promise" that they won't let boys disrupt their friendship again; they do so and move to kiss each other, but Elsa interrupts. They go downstairs for cake, where Casey is happy to find that Elsa sent most of the guests home, and she kisses Evan in a display to Izzie, which successfully makes her jealous and uncomfortable. Sam gifts Casey a comic he made, the last part of his ritual, and tells her that he got accepted to Denton; the two reconcile. Meanwhile, Doug goes to confront Nick after being unable to get him out of his head all day.
18	10	"Ernest Shackleton's Rules for Survival"	Ken Whittingham	Robia Rashid	September 7, 2018
Doug punches Nick in the face outside the bar. Sam gives Julia an invitation to his graduation and they talk briefly. Elsa tells Doug that she is starting to get haircut appointments through her website. Sam tells his family that they need to stop helping him so he can become "fully independent". Paige is annoyed to learn through Sam that the girl he has been kissing smudged the paint on her bench. Elsa talks to Casey, telling her about a sexual encounter she had with a woman, attempting to comfort Casey and express acceptance of her sexuality. Casey later has sex with Evan. Paige works out that Sam has been kissing Bailey. Sam becomes upset upon seeing that classmates have written offensive terms over his picture in the school yearbook (which goes to show they are ableists). He asks the student distributing yearbooks for a new one; when she refuses, he frustratedly slams his on the table, causing the table to collapse. Back home, Elsa panics when she hears Sam has not turned up to work. She, Doug, and Casey find Sam at the aquarium. The next day, as they drive to his graduation, Elsa discovers a flyer in Doug's bag from the bar Nick works at. She works out that he punched Nick and asks him if he can ever forgive what she did, but Sam interrupts. At the ceremony, Paige remains in her seat when she is due to give her valedictorian speech, as her voice is too hoarse to speak after viciously defending Sam at school over the yearbook incident. Sam delivers the speech for her, with frequent interjections to comment on it. Later, Sam tells Paige that he thinks he is in love with her. Doug talks about not being able to move past Elsa's affair to a woman from his peer group. Casey talks to Izzie about having had sex with Evan, but the two then hold hands.

=== Season 3 (2019) ===
No. overall	No. in season	Title	Directed by	Written by	Original release date
19	1	"Best Laid Plans"	Ryan Case	Robia Rashid	November 1, 2019
On their way to the school lock-in, Paige decides she is willing to get back together with Sam for the summer. They then find out they missed the lock-in. Meanwhile, Elsa accidentally sets a mattress on fire after smoking. Sam gets worried about college after a girl with autism tells him that four out of five autistic students fail to graduate within four years. Elsa is annoyed at Doug for spending time with a woman in his study group, Megan. At dinner, Sam discusses a good first day at Denton, but Casey has to be rushed to the hospital with appendicitis. Paige wants to have sex with Sam, but the pair are interrupted on several occasions before they can start. Their last opportunity before Paige goes to work as a camp counsellor is on Friday, after they have dinner at the Olive Garden. Stressed at how Doug is still not discussing things with her, Elsa consults a heavily-pregnant Julia for advice. At the Olive Garden, Sam realizes the date and panics, as he has missed the first day of registration for classes. After talking to Casey, he apologizes to Paige for fleeing from their date. He manages to get all of the courses he wanted except one. Casey is feeling conflicted about Evan and Izzie.
20	2	"Standing Sam"	Rebecca Asher	Theresa Mulligan Rosenthal	November 1, 2019
Zahid tells Sam to "reinvent himself" in college. At orientation, Sam's humor helps him to quickly make some new friends. Sam decides to reinvent himself, skips a meeting and decides he wants to live in the dorms. At couple's therapy Doug and Elsa talk about their relationship issues, which Elsa started with one lie and continued from there. At school, Nate offers Casey and Izzie milkshakes as an apology, but after calling Casey a bitch, she slaps his milkshake into his face. Doug helps Megan when her autistic daughter Amber has a panic attack. Sam and Casey go and look at Sam's dorm and meet his roommate, who is coincidentally called Sam G. Sam decides not to live in the dorm, discovering it would be overstimulating and too unfamiliar after losing his just-newly-found friends. He still spends some time with Sam G before he leaves, though. Megan texts Doug and he lies to Elsa about from whom the text is.
21	3	"Cocaine Pills and Pony Meat"	Victor Nelli Jr.	Bob Smiley	November 1, 2019
Sam begins classes and starts to become a little overwhelmed by the lack of routine and a strict schedule. Doug and Megan start hanging out more often. Elsa visits Julia who has had her baby. Izzie and Casey hope to get scholarships for UCLA. Casey tells Evan about her desires to go to UCLA and asks him if he would go, but he seems hesitant and awkward when Izzie's name is brought up. Sam starts using his phone to keep him on schedule and has trouble sleeping because of the big changes in his life. Sam oversleeps and while he is running late to class, Sam G runs into him and hurts his head. Sam G comforts him once again, though. Elsa goes to Megan to bring back a jacket and they have a quick heart to heart about their children. Doug talks Sam into going to disability services for accommodations; he is introduced to Sid, a volunteer, who shows him around and he is pleased with the environment of the offices. He even meets Jasper, one of the other kids from the support group at Newton, there. Casey upsets Evan by gifting him a book about finding direction in life, but they make up. The next day, Sam gets to his class and now has a note taker, "Excited Evelyn."
22	4	"Y.G.A.G.G."	Wendey Stanzler	Mike Oppenhuizen	November 1, 2019
Evan's dog Dewey is sick, but the dog is with his dad in New Hampshire. Sam cannot find his pencil and accuses a classmate, Abby, of stealing it. Abby invites Sam to a party/"art jam", but he turns down the invitation. Doug finds out Elsa stopped by at Megan's place. Zahid talks Sam into going to the party. Elsa organizes a clothing drive, which Izzie shows up to. Casey, Evan, and Beth go to New Hampshire, and Evan's father and his wife instantly rub Evan the wrong way. Paige tells Sam to go to the party, but do not be like the "dorm rat", a girl who was found during a party eating cheese in the corner because she was so hungry. This "dorm rat" does not have any friends and eats a microwaved burrito by herself every night. Evan finds out that Dewey is fine and that his dad only called him there to get his signature to withdraw money from his college fund. Casey yells at him and Beth steals Dewey. Sam decides to attend the art jam; he is pleased to find it is a calm environment and enjoys himself, but Zahid is bored. Zahid meets Gretchen by dumpster outside of the party and they smoke while listening to Miley Cyrus. Izzie and Elsa bond over their difficult childhoods. Evan's car breaks down and Doug helps him, suggesting to Evan the idea of becoming an EMT. Paige turns out to be the "dorm rat" she described, given that she throws a burrito at a schoolmate who teases her.
23	5	"Only Tweed"	Victor Nelli Jr.	D.J. Ryan	November 1, 2019
Evan wants to go on a ride along with Doug, but is worried about the EMT test, and Paige has a hearing for throwing a scalding hot burrito at a schoolmate. Zahid and Gretchen have a 68-hour date. In class, Sam's professor says that if they do not speak during the seminar, they will fail. He is pressured and fails, but his professor lets him write a paper. He still worries about the next seven assignments. Elsa meets her mom and they barely speak. Paige decides to have a dinner party (via Skype) and invites their friends, while Evan bails out on his EMT ride along. Izzie is Casey's "date" for the dinner party because Evan has work. Zahid and Gretchen show up. Paige and Casey get annoyed by Gretchen's behavior and her antagonizing Sam. Izzie yells at Evan for not showing up to Doug's ride along, Paige accidentally sees Zahid's penis, Gretchen tells Evan that she thought Izzie and Casey were a couple, Paige does not get expelled from school over the burrito, and Sam gets a "C" on his ethics paper, which is not that good but is still a vast improvement. Zahid tells Sam that Gretchen was probably antagonizing him to guide him in the right direction, which Sam denies. Sam gets a "C" on the next seminar and finds Paige at his house, having dropped out of college. Casey finds out that Evan has dyslexia, why he is afraid of tests and didn't go to the ride along, and Elsa's mom arrives at the house.
24	6	"The Essence of a Penguin"	Michael Medico	Mike Oppenhuizen & Lauren Moon	November 1, 2019
Paige tells about her challenges at college and her vice of online shopping. She describes accumulating over $6,000 in debt, buying a canoe, and eating cheese in the corner during a party. Sam gets praised for his technical drawing of Stumpy, the penguin, but then the next assignment throws out the rules and challenges him to draw "the essence" of a penguin. Paige is too busy with job interviews and world domination to help Sam discover the essence of a penguin, but Zahid offers to drive him to the aquarium regularly if Sam does inventory at work. Casey is still angry at Izzie for how she treated Evan at the party; Evan tries another ride along. Gretchen convinces Zahid to give up gluten. Izzie does not show up to school and does not message Casey, which worries her, and Casey hears of a time when Izzie did not show up to school for three weeks. Evan goes on the ride along with Doug and consoles a child while Doug treats the child's mother, who was the driver of the vehicle in the accident to which they were responding. Sam still struggles with the penguin's "essence", and while at the aquarium notices Stumpy's irregular behavior. He notifies the penguin trainer, who discovers Stumpy has a parasitic infection, thus saving her life. Casey gets a message from Izzie, but still brings her clothes from Elsa. She finds out that Izzie's mom abruptly abandons Izzie and her other children from time to time. Elsa visits Paige, who now works a low-paying job as a potato mascot at Sal E. Sour Cream (a children's party restaurant similar to Chuck E. Cheese) and comforts her with her challenges. Sam discovers the essence of a penguin while Izzie apologizes to Casey, saying she was jealous of Evan, and stays the night.
25	7	"Shrinkage"	Annabel Oakes	Bob Smiley & Nicole Betz	November 1, 2019
Casey sleeps nexts to Izzie, but is tense and nervous the whole night and cannot sleep. She avoids Izzie the next day. In ethics class, Sam does not have trouble answering ethics questions (train problem and bank robber/orphans). Sam discovers Gretchen stole a turquoise Fitbit from the Techtropolis he works at (noticeable in the previous episode). Izzie walks in on Evan and Casey kissing. Sam presents the evidence of Gretchen stealing the Fitbit to Zahid, and Zahid tells him to mark it down as shrinkage. Sam has a moral conundrum. Julia struggles with the challenges of being a single mom and "crumping" (crying while pumping); she invites Sam to a gathering for people on the spectrum at the university. Sam attends, finds his new friend, Sid, and consults with her about his interpersonal struggles. Sid does not offer much sympathy, and is more interested in beating Jasper at Battleship. Sam returns the favor by helping Jasper sink Sid's battleship. Casey struggles at practice because of her feelings for Izzie and gets sent home early. Doug goes to a Fleetwood Mac concert with Megan, which angers Elsa. Sam tells Zahid that Gretchen is a "parasite" and has changed him, but Zahid argues that his relationship is true love and is so much deeper than what Sam has experienced with Paige. Sam tells his manager Bob of Gretchen's theft, getting her banned and putting Zahid on very thin ice. Zahid tells Sam they are no longer friends and Elsa tells Doug she thinks they should separate. Izzie looks for Casey to confront her about her avoidance and finds Casey running the track at night in distress, and the two kiss.
26	8	"Road Rage Paige"	Ken Whittingham	Robia Rashid	November 1, 2019
Izzie and Casey meet Evan's sister, bringing Casey back to the harsh reality of her confusion between her feelings for Izzie and relationship with Evan. Casey asks Doug how he wishes he found out about Elsa's infidelity, and Doug tells her that he would have wanted to hear it directly from Elsa's mouth. In a flashback to Sam's first day at Techtropolis, we see how Zahid helped him out and they became instant friends. In the present day, Zahid is still angry at Sam. Meanwhile, Paige begins road raging, which bothers Sam. Sam gets bad advice from multiple people about Paige, but receives good advice from Evan. Casey and Izzie continue to flirt. Evan asks Casey what is wrong, and Casey lies to him. Sam asks Paige if everything is okay, and Paige opens up to him about her struggles and the two of them have sex at the dorm. Casey later tearfully tells Evan about her and Izzie's kiss, and Casey breaks up with him. Sam tells Evan he is his new Zahid, but Evan declines and Sam finds out Evan and Casey broke up. Doug finds Evan sitting in his car in their driveway, he tells Doug he does not know how to leave, because then it is real, and Doug then tells Elsa to take the divorce slow and not tell the kids.
27	9	"Sam Takes a Walk"	Robia Rashid	Robia Rashid & Annie Mebane	November 1, 2019
Elsa and Casey have a mani-pedi and Casey has a voiceover about how she misses Evan, while Sam misses Zahid and sees him all around. Paige wants to talk about their alone time, but Sam has to do an art project about something political, which he decides to do on the death of baby Magellanic penguins due to human activity. Sam catches Casey and Izzie kissing. Casey asks if he is fine with it and he compares them to two male penguins, Sphen and Magic, and their baby Sphengic. Sam continues to draw dead and dying bloody baby penguins but is unsatisfied with his drawing. Elsa and Doug fight, while Casey shows Izzie a drawing of Sphen and Magic. Casey and Izzie have a confrontation because Izzie says she does not want to broadcast their relationship; Izzie apologizes and asks to go slow. Paige checks up on Sam, making sure the stovetop is not leaking gas, and angers him. Sam finds Zahid's shirt, brings it to him at work, and accidentally sets it on fire and sets off the sprinklers. Casey and Izzie go to a party and while dancing Izzie feels that Casey is getting too close, and Izzie winds up making out with a guy at the party. Elsa and Doug play "Sam Takes a Walk" and talk about their relationship. Sam notices his drawings were smudged by the Techtropolis sprinklers and realized that smudges provide the finishing touch that he was missing. Casey, angry at Izzie, wins her heat at the track meet and avoids Izzie. Sam apologizes to Bob for accidentally setting Zahid's shirt on fire. Bob apologizes to Sam because it is partly Bob's fault for him hooking up the gas while he is living at Techtropolis during his marital problems. Sam finds out Zahid is eloping with Gretchen, but it is on the same date as Zahid's nursing exam, which Sam promised not to let him screw up.
28	10	"Searching for Brown Sugar Man"	Ken Whittingham	Robia Rashid	November 1, 2019
Sam searches for Zahid with Abby (from the art jam) and Izzie kisses Casey in public at school. Coach Crowley tells Casey that UCLA is scouting her, but she is gonna have to really push for it and get rid of crazy drama. Paige, Abby, Sam, and Casey (wearing a biking helmet thanks to Paige's continuous road rage) go to where they believe Zahid is getting married with a canoe on top of Paige's car. Doug goes to the work trip with Megan in New York, and Elsa realizes she backed off too much. Gretchen dumps Zahid when her ex shows up to the wedding, and Sam finds Zahid at the batting cage, taking softballs to the chest. Sam jumps in front of Zahid to stop Zahid from taking a softball directly to the chest without a thick outer coat. Casey and Paige speak about their troubles. Megan and Doug talk about their feelings for each other, but Doug is still unsure of what is going on with his marriage and they kiss. Sam and Zahid make up. Elsa leaves in a hurry to stop Doug's affair and crashes into Doug's car in the driveway. They share a kiss. Zahid passes his mid-term and Paige sells the canoe to some random person online (which happens to be Sam). Casey talks to Evan, who tells her to go to UCLA and they have some closure. It turns out Sam skipped his midterm for ethics to help Zahid with his nursing midterm, and Doug starts wearing his wedding ring again. Paige gets an offer to be a nanny, and it turns out to be for Julia. Casey decides to work hard for UCLA as well as continue to date Izzie. Sam and Zahid decide to become roommates.

=== Season 4 (2021) ===
No. overall	No. in season	Title	Directed by	Written by	Original release date
29	1	"Magical Bird #1"	Tom Magill	D.J. Ryan	July 9, 2021
Sam moves in with Zahid into a new apartment, although he later can't stand it due to Zahid's strange habits and lifestyle. Meanwhile, Casey tries to tell Doug about her new relationship with Izzie, while Doug also takes on Casey's ex boyfriend Evan as a trainee EMT.
30	2	"Master of Penguins"	Michael Medico	Bob Smiley	July 9, 2021
Sam is given a letter stating that he is in danger of academic probation. To prevent this, he tries to interview as much people as possible for an extra credit assignment. Meanwhile, Casey's demanding schedule begins to affect her grades, as she continues training for UCLA. Paige also gets the chance to become the manager of her workplace. While attending Zumba classes, Elsa runs into Megan who is picking Amber up from violin lessons. On the way to a retirement party for Doug's colleague Chuck, Doug reveals to Elsa that he and Megan kissed in New York.
31	3	"You Say You Want a Revolution"	Rebecca Asher	Mike Oppenhuizen	July 9, 2021
Sam decides that he wants to travel to Antarctica, and starts making plans to get money for the trip. However, Bob announces that Techtropolis is closing, leaving Sam and Zahid without a job to pay for their rent. Sam then decides to do a yard sale, which also doesn't go well. After getting some advice from his friend Abby, Sam decides to organize a fundraiser with his friends to get money. At the fundraiser, he makes a presentation with a slideshow and his friends give him money. Paige, who had a date with Sam scheduled for that night, grows frustrated and reaches her breaking point, snapping that Sam can't stand cold weather and hasn't even flown before. This causes Sam to get upset. Casey however, steals the keys to Paige's work place and they spend some time in the freezer to get Sam accustomed to cold temperatures. Meanwhile, Casey and Izzie decide to organize a protest against Clayton's school dress code. Doug also finds out that his former colleague Chuck has had a heart attack and died.
32	4	"Starters and Endings"	Angela Tortu	Robia Rashid	July 9, 2021
After Doug and Elsa attend Chuck's funeral, Doug sinks into a depression. He takes Chuck's sourdough starter and stores it in his fridge. When Elsa accidentally disposes of it, it causes him to snap at both Elsa and Sam. Paige apologizes to Sam for her outburst and gives him a pair of snow boots for his planned trip to Antarctica. He struggles to learn how to make a tent, but later gets help from Doug after he apologizes for his outburst. Meanwhile, Casey and Izzie worry that they may get suspended for their protest, but Casey ends up getting a warning while Izzie gets suspended. Casey also begins getting stressed with her busy schedule, so she begins bullying Paige by making her do ridiculous tasks.
33	5	"Dead Dreams"	Heather Jack	Nicole Betz	July 9, 2021
Sam organizes his planned trip to Antarctica. He later turns to Zahid for medical advice, who schedules a physical for both of them. Casey meets Izzie's mother Sasha, whose strange hobbies make Izzie uneasy. Doug buys Sam a pocket knife for Sam's trip to Antarctica. Elsa, however, feels that Sam should not embark on his trip to Antarctica, but Doug convinces her to support Sam. On the day of Sam's physical, he gets scared and runs out. Elsa's support group urges her to take a sabbatical from the group. During dinner, an argument breaks out between Sam and Elsa after Elsa didn't cook the food he is required to eat for Antarctica. Sam meets Niles Blanderman (a fictional explorer who died in Antarctica) in a dream who convinces him that he snapped at his mother. Elsa meets Sam at his apartment with healthy foods, but Sam begins to feel he can't go to Antarctica. Elsa teaches Sam about adapting to new changes. Izzie meets Casey and apologizes for her outburst and the two reconcile. Sam then gets the courage to take his physical and asks Zahid to take care of his turtle, Edison.
34	6	"Are You in Fair Health?"	Jennifer Arnold	Bob Smiley	July 9, 2021
Sam gets his physical results back stating that he is in fair health. Izzie makes pies with Elsa and invites her to a PTA meeting for Izzie's protest against Clayton's school dress code. Sasha then comes by to pick Izzie up from the house, and Sasha's personality makes Elsa uneasy. Doug confesses to Elsa that he doesn't like Izzie, and sees her as a distraction to Casey's training for UCLA. After Zahid doesn't make it to the vet with Edison for Sam, Zahid tells Sam that he unsure about being Edison's guardian which makes Sam angry and results in an argument between the two. Casey confesses to Izzie that she changed Izzie's answers to questions on her physics test to help her pass. Sam isn't able to find a suitable guardian for Edison. He later turns to Casey and they talk about their struggles with their friends. Paige returns the tree that Sam got rid of to Sam, which makes Sam decide to appoint Paige as Edison's guardian. Sam, however, realizes that Zahid had serious concerns about not being Edison's guardian and rushes to meet him. Elsa meets Izzie at the bus station, and she confesses that her mother kicked her out and that she thinks her dating Casey is just a phase. Sam meets Zahid at the hospital to apologize to Zahid. Zahid, however, confesses that he has been potentially diagnosed with cancer. Izzie and Casey apologize to each other and reconcile. Elsa meets with Sasha with a coconut cream pie and talks to her about her way of life and how she shuns Izzie. Offended, Sasha throws Elsa out of the house but accidentally drops the pie to which Elsa angrily leaves. Zahid gets his diagnosis of testicular cancer, but much to his relief it is treatable. Later, Sam and Paige are shocked to discover Zahid's ex-girlfriend Gretchen in their living room with Zahid.
35	7	"Channel the Cat"	Fernando Sariñana	Mike Oppenhuizen	July 9, 2021
Sam talks to Zahid about Gretchen and how awful she is. However, Zahid refuses to break up with her. Casey surprises Doug with some new sourdough starter to keep him from bothering her about training. Sam talks to her friends about Zahid's relationship with Gretchen and his plans for his trip to Antarctica. Casey talks to Izzie and Izzie tells Casey that her mother kicked her out. Izzie invites Casey to a party. Zahid and Gretchen begin having sex next to Sam's room which overwhelms him. He talks to Paige about it and she thinks they should have some more sex before he goes off to Antarctica. Elsa meets with Lillian and talks to her. Sam talks to his friends about his sex life but Sid talks him out of it in order to focus on a cat drawing for her. Paige talks to Gretchen about it, but after Sam comes out and chastises them for talking too loud, he accidentally reveals that Sid is a girl, which infuriates Paige. After talking to Gretchen, Paige tries to seduce Sam by sexting him, but accidentally sends her photo to a group chat with Sam, Casey, Elsa, and Doug. Casey gets a letter of official interest from UCLA. Casey reveals to Vice Principal Patrick that she cheated on Izzie's physics test but Casey is only given a warning. Sam continues to find Gretchen's presence in their apartment annoying and continues to ask Zahid to break up with her but Zahid still refuses to break up with her, he then refuses to let Sam attend his medical appointments and ask Gretchen to accompany her. Paige meets up with Doug and Elsa and apologizes for what happened. Elsa accepts the apology and later meets up with Lillian. Elsa tells her about her concerns over Sam's trip to Antarctica. Zahid gets a text from Gretchen while waiting for his ultrasound, which tells him that she is at her hairdresser instead. This helps Zahid slowly realize that Gretchen is a bad person. After a talk with Sam, he tells Sam that he broke up with Gretchen. Sam offers to learn how to drive so that he can drive Zahid home from his cancer surgery. Paige meets Sam and confesses her jealousy and how her mistake was from bad advice from Gretchen. She impersonates a penguin dance to successfully seduce Sam. At an important track event, Casey and Izzie see a UCLA recruiter at the event. However, Casey doesn't run after the race begins.
36	8	"Magical Bird #2"	Robia Rashid	Robia Rashid	July 9, 2021
Sam asks Casey to teach him how to drive. Casey becomes distant from her family after not starting the race. Casey feels she can't live up to a motivational hero called "Mighty Moe", and a flashback reveals that after the race started she left the track and walked downtown. Sam reveals to Casey about Zahid's cancer and that he wants to drive him home from his surgery. During a drive, Casey and Sam meet Sam's friend Abby, who has started spray painting artwork of birds on building walls, capturing Casey's attention. During a talk with Abby, Casey reveals that her intense training schedule is making her stressed. In another flashback a week after the track event, Casey meets Izzie and announces that she is quitting track. Meanwhile, Doug finds a crumbled letter under the table and a flashback reveals, that he spoke harshly to Izzie before crumbling it up and tossing it under the desk. Elsa also tries to spend some quality time with Doug, and they go over to Sam and Zahid's apartment to replace their bathroom door. While there, Doug discovers a "Little Dude" comic strip explaining Doug's absence during Sam's childhood. Elsa discovers a jar of weed in the kitchen. After an argument during a lesson, Sam tries to quit but Casey motivates him to keep driving. He nearly runs over Evan's dog Dewey. Elsa steals Zahid's jar of weed and Doug discovers it and tries to return it quietly, but Zahid opens the door and sees him. Zahid offers to let Doug join a group he has started in his flat. Casey and Sam return Dewey to Evan, much to Evan's delight. Evan offers to let Sam play his driving game. Beth sees Casey and angrily chastises her for breaking up with Evan. Casey runs away afterwards, after having a flashback of Izzie wanting to breakup with her because of her recent stress. Sam drives to catch up with Casey. Doug returns home with a cannabis joint and he and Elsa spend an evening together. Casey tells her old coach at Newton High school that she wants to return to her old team.
37	9	"Player's Ball"	Kevin Rodney Sullivan	Mike Oppenhuizen	July 9, 2021
During Techtropolis' closedown sale, Sam reveals to Zahid that he hasn't heard back from Denton's Antarctica program. Zahid decides to hold a going away party. Casey packs away her things from Clayton Prep and is preparing to return to Newton High. Izzie reveals that Sam invited her to his party. But Izzie reveals that Doug hurt her feelings and that was the reason that Izzie broke up with Casey, angering Casey. Sam turns to Elsa for advice on organizing his party, but Zahid's strange ideas make Elsa feel uneasy. Meanwhile, Paige is requested to put back on her potato outfit at Sal E. Sour Cream, after the current potato waitress sprained her ankle. She turns back to Sam and Zahid for advice on her life. Casey talks to Abby and discovers her tattoo talents. Elsa later gets some shocking news from Denton and confesses to Zahid that Sam's program got cancelled because of lack of interest. Doug meets Lillian during his shift after a passerby called him to report concern of her at a bus stop. Casey also hears that Izzie is unable to attend Sam's party. Bob also gets the idea from Abby to start his own new store called "Bobtropolis". Elsa tries to confess to Sam about Antarctica being cancelled, but gets a call from Doug about her mother, but Zahid comes in and spills the beans on the Antarctica program being cancelled, which enrages Sam. Casey talks to Abby while out eating hot dogs about her decision to leave Clayton and also asks Abby to give her a tattoo. Elsa returns home to discover Lillian in the kitchen with Doug. Meanwhile at Sal E. Sour Cream, Paige hears from Casey that Abby gave her a tattoo. Inspired that Casey overcame her fears, she sticks up to her boss and quits her job. Upon Laird telling her she can't come back to any store, Paige knocks down a sign and walks out. Zahid, meanwhile, finds that Sam has escaped the party, and he is at the empty Techtropolis store. Sam confesses that he felt bad about his plans to Antarctica falling through while Casey confesses that she is bisexual. Zahid also reveals that he is scared about the surgery but Casey and Sam comfort him with a hug. Sam and Zahid say their goodbyes to Techtropolis stating that they will miss the place. Paige also comes in and delightfully announces that she has quit her job.
38	10	"Dessert at Olive Garden"	Michael Medico	Robia Rashid	July 9, 2021
Izzie wants to talk to Casey because she thinks that she is the one that ruined their relationship. Casey disagrees, they kiss each other and confirm that they are staying a couple, and they have sex for the first time. Sam is sad about the Antarctica program being cancelled and talks about it with Professor Judd. She mentions that there is a program for a trip to Alaska. Sam thinks she is joking. Sam gets rid of everything that reminds him of Antarctica, and he also says goodbye to the penguins in the aquarium. Doug still can't sleep because of the dreams he has about Chuck playing tennis with 54-to-zero score, but he later makes the connection when he tells Evan that he has 54 vacation days saved up. Elsa called someone from UCLA to talk to Casey about it. Sam decides he does want to go to Antarctica, just without a program. Sam goes back to the aquarium to tell Stumpy that he is going to Antarctica. Doug joins him there, and he asks Sam if he can come with him to Antarctica. Sam agrees. Izzie tells Casey that she also talked about UCLA with the same person as Casey. They promise that if one of them gets in, she needs to go. Doug apologized to Casey about the stuff he said to Izzie. Sam and Paige are dining at Olive Garden. Paige is really excited about Sam's trip. Sam says that he loves Paige and says that they should pause their relationship until he gets back. Sam says goodbye to Zahid and his tortoise, Edison. Doug is packed and kisses Elsa goodbye, Sam comes home and says goodbye to Elsa and Casey. Sam steps out the door and he is standing in Antarctica.

== Background, production, and release ==
The coming-of-age series, originally known as Antarctica, was created and written by Robia Rashid, who previously worked on How I Met Your Mother and The Goldbergs as a producer. For a more accurate portrayal, she consulted with Michelle Dean, a professor who worked at UCLA's Center for Autism Research and Treatment. Gilchrist said in an interview for Vulture, "[Rashid] wrote the script. We talked a ton and I did research and I watched movies and I read books". The supporting character Christopher is played by Anthony Jacques, who is autistic.

Season 1 was released on August 11, 2017, and consisted of eight episodes. On September 13, 2017, Atypical was renewed for a ten-episode second season. David Finch, who is autistic, joined the writing team. Eight autistic actors from The Miracle Project have supporting roles in the second season as members of a peer support group which Sam joins, and other autistic actors play non-autistic characters. Executive producer Mary Rohlich also said the show was "bringing in more female directors and female diversity": seven of the ten episodes were directed by women and half of the writing team were female.

The second season was released on September 7, 2018, and consisted of 10 episodes. On October 24, 2018, Atypical was renewed for a third season of 10 episodes. In May 2019, it was announced Eric McCormack and Sara Gilbert would appear in the third season. The third season was released on November 1, 2019, and consisted of 10 episodes. On February 24, 2020, Atypical was renewed for its fourth and last season. The season consisted of ten episodes and premiered on July 9, 2021.

== Reception ==
=== Season 1 ===
At the review aggregator Metacritic, the first season received a score of 66 from 20 reviews, indicating "generally favorable reviews". On Rotten Tomatoes, 74% of 42 critics have given the season a positive review with an average rating of 5.4 out of 10. The website's consensus is: "Great performances and a likable, realistic family dealing with autism lift Atypical above its alarming tonal shifts and predictability." The acting was generally well-received, although Gilchrist's portrayal received criticism for being "inaccurate" and "stereotypical". The lack of autistic people in the cast was also questioned.

=== Season 2 ===
Sara Luterman of The New York Times wrote that the second season improves on the first. Sam's decision to go to art school deviates from common depictions of autism, and his being autistic is no longer "the source of [his family's] misery". Luterman praised the involvement of more autistic people as writers and actors, but criticized that Sam's misogyny is unaddressed and that he is "still portrayed as more of a checklist than a person". Lorraine Ali of the Los Angeles Times lauded the show's continuing "unique perspective, sharp humor and empathy", and described the show as a "wonderfully atypical family drama" with "many moving and awkward moments".

In a negative review, Jen Chaney of Vulture wrote that the show "loses some of its focus" in the second season, such as with the "unnecessary side plot" of Julia, an "underdeveloped side character", or by attempting to make Zahid a "lovably wacky sidekick". Chaney stated that the show's situations "often seem contrived or aim blatantly for the easy joke", and criticized scenes between Doug and Elsa which "don't seem reflective of actual human behavior". However, Chaney praised Lundy-Paine's acting, which switches between "understanding" and "exasperation", and Gilchrist's "yard-stick straight" acting.

=== Season 3 ===
On Rotten Tomatoes, season 3 has a 100% rating based on 7 reviews, and the average rating is 7/10. Merrill Barr of Forbes wrote, "Season three of Atypical is the show's boldest to date and truly feels like it has reached its stride. [...] Now, the show just gets to live and breathe as it explores its unique story in ever-evolving and fascinating ways." Holly Edwards of Film Inquiry concluded that "the dramatic and comedic beats almost always hit the right notes and know when a shift in tone is required." She called the show a "step up from many shows of the same variety and a worthwhile viewing experience."

=== Season 4 ===
Lorraine Ali of the Los Angeles Times wrote that the final season of Atypical "deftly tackles" the fears parents of atypical children may have when watching their son or daughter come of age. She also noted the season "cement[ed] the show's legacy as one of the best series to deal with autism and its butterfly effect on family, friends, and loved ones".

=== Accolades ===
Year	Award	Category	Nominee(s)	Result	Ref.
2018	Satellite Awards	Best Musical or Comedy Series	Atypical	Nominated	
2018	Peabody Awards	Entertainment	Atypical	Nominated	

== See also ==
- Autism friendly
- Autism rights movement
- Autism spectrum disorders in the media
