= Bob Smiley =

American screenwriter

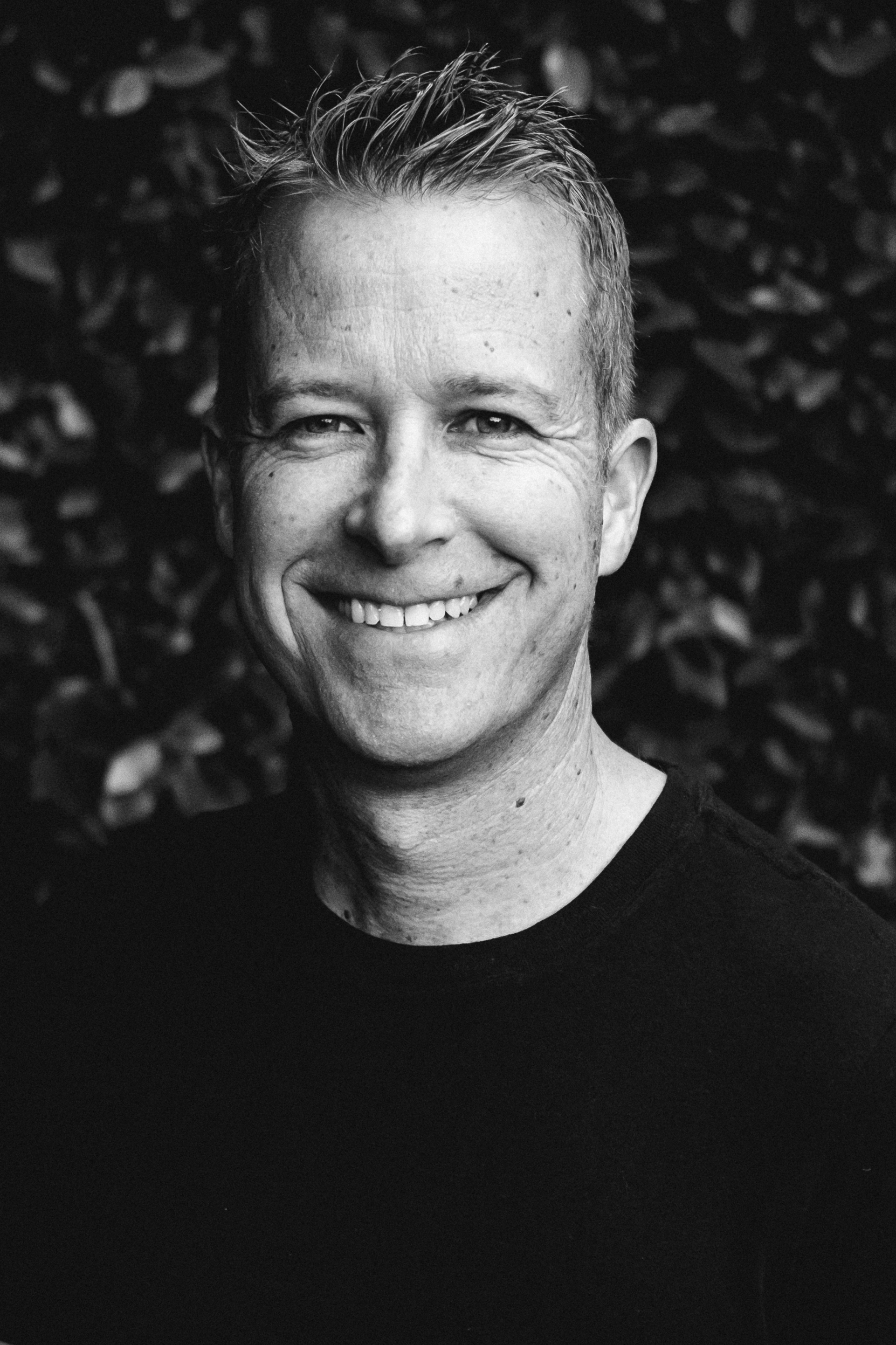
Bob Smiley, 2019.

Bob Smiley (born June 28, 1977, in Ventura, California) is an American writer, founder of Silver Cord Stories, and partner in the Humble Picture Company. He is a Writers Guild of America-award winner for his work in TV and is the author of three books, the 2008 memoir Follow the Roar, the 2012 novel Don't Mess with Travis, and the 2025 story compilation The Silver Cord. He has also been a contributing writer to espn.com.

== Silver Cord Stories ==
In late-2024, Smiley founded Silver Cord Stories as a platform to write and share original short stories that "take aim at the heart and the soul." Nineteen of these stories comprise Smiley's 2025 book The Silver Cord.

== TV/film career ==
Smiley was a writer and co-executive producer on the Netflix series Atypical. He executive produced the Disney Channel pilot Forever Boys. He has also written for Yes, Dear on CBS, The Haunted Hathaways on Nickelodeon, Puppy Dog Pals on Disney Junior.

In film, he has written biopics on shock rocker Alice Cooper and boxing legend Joe Gans.

== Humble Picture Company ==
In 2016, Smiley founded the Humble Picture Company with writer Grant Nieporte. Their inaugural producing project is a film adaptation of the book Hope Heals. Their film Liz Here Now, starring Anjanue Ellis-Taylor, is currently in post-production. They also are producers on the film Gym Rat, currently in development with A24, PASTEL, and Unanimous Media.

== Follow The Roar ==
In 2008, Smiley followed Tiger Woods from the gallery for the entirety of Woods' season and wrote a memoir about the adventure. Smiley came up with the idea after following Tiger for the second round of the Target World Challenge in December 2007. Smiley wrote an article for espn.com about the round, in which Tiger shot a tournament-record 62.
